= Portuguese India Armadas =

Fleets used to trade with India

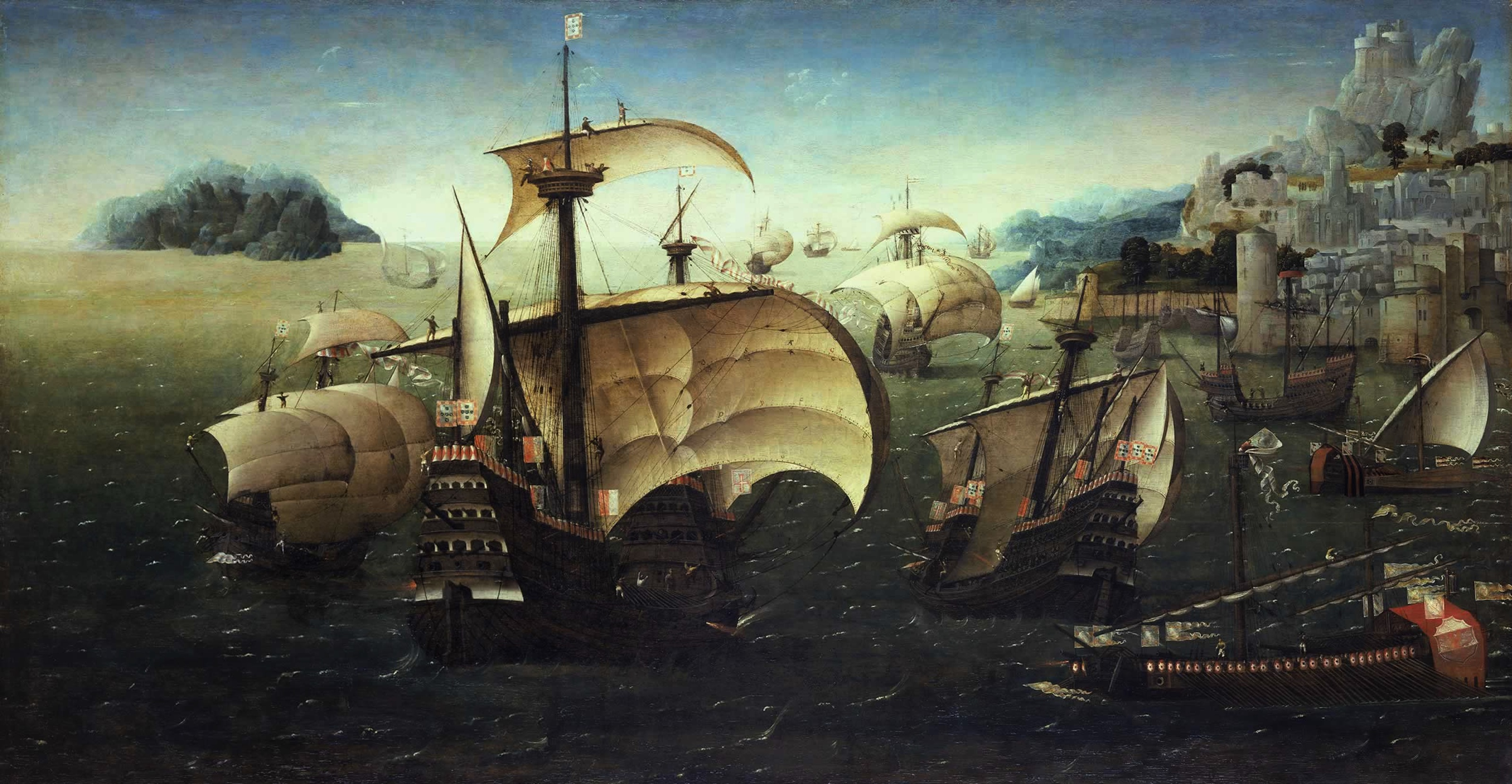
The large carrack, thought to be the Santa Catarina do Monte Sinai, and other Portuguese carracks of various sizes. From painting, attributed to either Gregório Lopes or Cornelis Antoniszoon, showing voyage of the marriage party of Portuguese Infanta Beatriz to Savoy, 1521.

The Portuguese Indian Armadas (Note: (Portuguese: Armadas da Índia; meaning "Armadas of India")) were the fleets of ships funded by the Crown of Portugal, and dispatched on an annual basis from Portugal to India. The principal destination was Goa, and previously Cochin. These armadas undertook the Carreira da Índia ('India Run') from Portugal, following the maritime discovery of the Cape Route, to the Indian subcontinent by Vasco da Gama in 1497–99.

The annual Portuguese India armada was the main carrier of the spice trade between Europe and Asia during the 16th Century. The Portuguese monopoly on the Cape route was maintained for a century, until it was breached by Dutch and English competition in the early 1600s. The Portuguese India armadas declined in importance thereafter. During the Dutch occupation of Cochin and the Dutch siege of Goa, the harbour of Bom Bahia, now known as Mumbai (Bombay), off the coast of the northern Konkan region, served as the standard diversion for the armadas.

== The India Run ==
For a long time after its discovery by Vasco da Gama, the sea route to India via the Cape of Good Hope was dominated by the Portuguese India armada – the annual fleet dispatched from Portugal to India, and after 1505, the Estado da India. Between 1497 and 1650, there were 1033 departures of ships at Lisbon for the Carreira da Índia ("India Run").

=== Timing ===
The route of Vasco da Gama's first voyage (1497–1499), what became the typical Carreira da Índia

The India armada typically left Lisbon and each leg of the voyage took approximately six months. (Note: Duarte Pacheco Pereira (1509) strongly recommended February as the ideal departure month. Godinho (1963: v. 3, pp. 43–44) calculates that 87% of departures left in March or April, and the 13% outside that range were usually destined for elsewhere (Africa, Arabia).) The critical determinant of the timing was the monsoon winds of the Indian Ocean. The monsoon was a southwesterly wind (i.e. blew from East Africa to India) in the summer (between May and September) and then abruptly reversed itself and became a northeasterly (from India to Africa) in the winter (between October and April). The ideal timing was to pass the Cape of Good Hope around June–July and get to the East African middle coast by August, just in time to catch the summer monsoon winds to India, arriving around early September. The return trip from India would typically begin in January, taking the winter monsoon back to Lisbon along a similar route, arriving by the summer (June–August). Overall, the round trip took a little over a year, minimizing the time at sea.

The critical step was ensuring the armada reached East Africa on time. Ships that failed to reach the equatorial latitude on the East African coast by late August would be stuck in Africa and have to wait until next spring to undertake an Indian Ocean crossing, and would then have to wait in India until the winter to begin their return, so any delay in East Africa during those critical few weeks of August could end up adding an entire extra year to a ship's journey. (Note: Godinho (1963: v. 3, p. 44) calculates that around 11% of outgoing ships missed the monsoon and ended up having to winter in East Africa.)

The circumnavigation of Madagascar opened an alternative route to get to India, which gave more flexibility in timing. The rule that quickly emerged was that if an outbound armada doubled the Cape of Good Hope before mid-July, then it should follow the old "inner route" – that is, sail into the Mozambique Channel, up the East African coast until the equatorial latitude (around Malindi, in modern-day Kenya), then take the southwesterly monsoon across the ocean to India. If, however, the armada doubled the Cape after mid-July, then it was obliged to sail the "outer route" – that is, strike out straight east from South Africa, go under the southern tip of Madagascar, and then turn up from there, taking a northerly path through the Mascarenes islands, across the open ocean to India. While the outer route did not have the support of African staging posts and important watering stops, it sidestepped sailing directly against the post-summer monsoon.

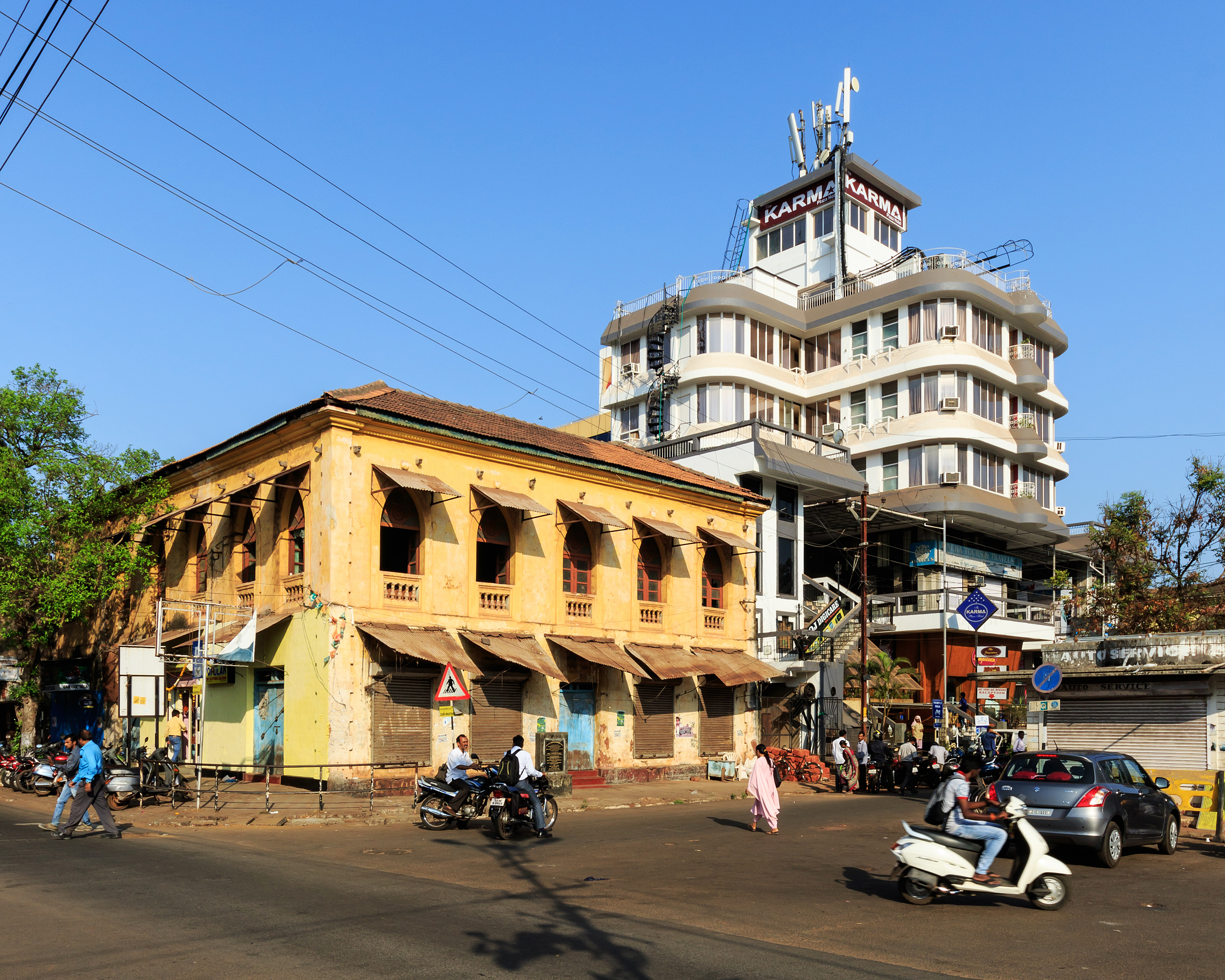
A brief view of the Indian city of Vasco da Gama

Return fleets were a different story. The principal worry of the return fleets was the fast dangerous waters of the inner Mozambican channel, which was particularly precarious for heavily loaded and less maneuverable ships. In the initial decades, the return fleet usually set out from Cochin in December, although that was eventually pushed forward to January. January 20 was the critical date, after which all return fleets were obliged to follow the outer route (east of Madagascar) which was deemed calmer and safer for their precious cargo. That meant they missed the important watering stop on Mozambique island on the return leg and had to put in elsewhere later, such as Mossel Bay or St. Helena. Between 1525 and 1579, all return fleets were ordered to follow the outer route. This rule was temporarily suspended between the 1570s and 1590s. From 1615, a new rule was introduced whereby return fleets from Goa were allowed to use the inner route, but return fleets from Cochin still had to use the outer route. With the entry of Dutch and English competition in the 1590s, the start of the return legs were delayed until February and March, with the predictable upsurge in lost and weather-delayed ships.

Arrival times in Portugal varied, usually between mid-June and late August. It was customary for return fleets to send their fastest ship ahead to announce the results in Lisbon, before the rest of the fleet arrived later that summer.

Because of the timing, an armada had to leave Lisbon (February–April) before the previous year's armada returned (June–August). To get news of the latest developments in India, the outgoing armada relied on notes and reports left along the way at various African staging posts by the returning fleet.

=== Outward voyage ===
Portuguese India armadas tended to follow the same outward route. There were several staging posts along the route of the India Run that were repeatedly used. (Note: For old roteiros of the India Run, see Duarte Pacheco Pereira (1509), João de Lisboa (1519: pp. 69ff) and Manuel Pimentel (1746: pp. 381ff))

Setting out from Lisbon (February–April), India-bound naus took the Canary Current straight southwest to the Canary Islands. The islands were owned by Castile and so this was not a usual watering stop for the Portuguese India armadas, except in emergencies.

The first real obstacle on the route was the Cape Verde peninsula (Cap-Vert, Senegal), around which the Canary Current ends and the equatorial drift begins. Although not difficult to double, it was a concentration point of sudden storms and Cape Verde-type hurricanes, so ships were frequently damaged.

The Cape Verde islands, to the west of the Cape Verde peninsula, were the usual first stop for India-bound ships. Relative scarcity of water and supplies on the islands made this a sub-optimal stop, but the islands (especially Santiago) served as a harbor against storms and were frequently a pre-arranged point for the collection and repair of damaged ships.

The Angra de Bezeguiche (Bay of Dakar, Senegal) was a common watering stop for ships after doubling Cape Verde. The shores were controlled by Wolof and Serer kingdoms, whose relations with the Portuguese were ambivalent, so a warm reception on the mainland could not always be counted on. In the middle of the bay was the island of Gorée (ilha de Bezeguiche), a safe anchoring spot, but the island itself lacked drinkable water. As a result, ships frequently watered and repaired at certain mainland points along the Petite Côte of Senegal such as Rio Fresco (now Rufisque) and Porto de Ale (now Saly-Portudal). It was not unheard of for India naus to water much further south, among the many inlets and islands (e.g. Bissagos) along the African coast to Sierra Leone.

Below Cape Verde, around the latitudes of Sierra Leone, began the Atlantic doldrums, a calm low pressure region on either side of the equator with little or no winds. At this time of year, the doldrums belt usually ranged between 5° N and 5° S. (Note: The exact latitude where the doldrums lay varies because of the "Atlantic mini-monsoon" phenomenon. During the summer months, the heating of West African mainland pulls winds up from the equator, shunting the doldrums belt further north.) In the southern hemisphere, below the doldrums, the counter-clockwise gyre of the South Atlantic and the southeasterly trade winds, prevented sailing directly southeast to the Cape.

Passing the doldrums was a navigational challenge, and pilots had to avail themselves deftly of the currents and every little breeze they could get to stay on course. The usual tactic was to proceed south or even southeast along the West African coast as long as possible, until the doldrums hit (usually around Sierra Leone), then to strike southwest sharply, drift over the doldrums and then catch the South Equatorial Current (the top arm of the South Atlantic gyre) towards the coast of Brazil. This was usually referred to as following the volta do mar (literally, 'turn of the sea', i.e. the South Atlantic gyre).

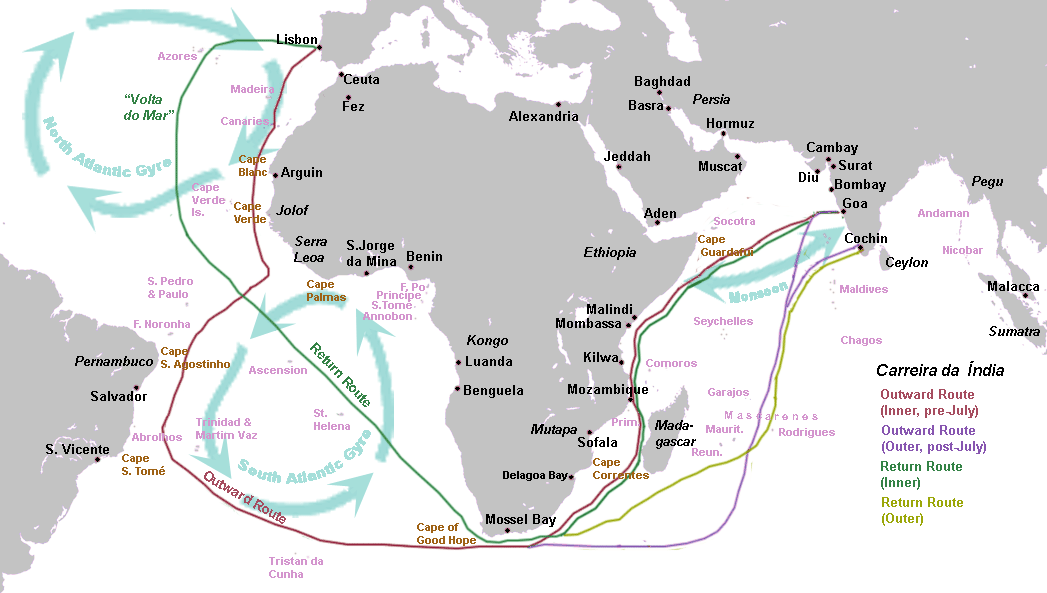
Outward and return voyages of the Portuguese India run (Carreira da Índia)

The volta do mar was usually contrasted to the rota da Mina (Mina route). The latter meant striking southeast in the doldrums to catch the Equatorial Counter Current (or Guinea Current) east into the Gulf of Guinea. This was the usual route to the fort of São Jorge da Mina on the Portuguese Gold Coast. This was not part of the India run. The route from Mina down to South Africa involved tacking against the southeasterly trade winds and the contrary Benguela Current, a particularly tiresome task for heavy square rigged carracks. However, it sometimes happened that by poor piloting, India naus would be inadvertently caught by the Guinea counter-current and forced to take that route, but such ships would not be likely to reach India that year. (Note: The rota da Mina had been the usual route used by all Portuguese explorers to Africa until the end of the 15th century. The first fleet to sail the volta do mar was Vasco da Gama's first fleet in 1497. However, credit for the discovery of the volta do mar as a route to the Cape ought to be given to Bartolomeu Dias, who in 1488–89, first discovered the westerlies below 30°S and the South Atlantic Current, from which was deduced the probable existence of the quicker and easier volta do mar route to the Cape. See Coutinho (1951–5: 319–63) and Waters (1988))

Assuming the India armada successfully caught the south equatorial current of the volta do mar, the armada would drift southwest through the doldrums and reach the southbound Brazil Current off the coast of Brazil (around Pernambuco). Although India naus did not usually stop in Brazil, it was not unheard of to put in a brief watering stop at Cape Santo Agostinho (Pernambuco, Brazil), especially if the southeasterly trade winds were particularly strong (pilots had to be careful not to allow themselves to be caught and driven backwards).

From the environs of Pernambuco, the India naus sailed straight south along the Brazil Current, until about the latitude of the Tropic of Capricorn, visibly the Abrolhos islands or the Trindade and Martim Vaz islands, where they began to catch more favorable prevailing westerlies. These would take them quickly straight east, across the South Atlantic, to South Africa.

The Cape of Good Hope–once aptly named the "cape of storms"–was a very challenging headland on the India Run. The outbound crossing was always difficult, and many a ship was lost here. Larger armadas often broke up into smaller squadrons to attempt the crossing, and would re-collect only on the other side – indeed quite far on the other side. There was usually no stop or collection point after the Cape crossing until well inside the Mozambique Channel. The reason for this is that outbound ships tried to steer clear from the South African coast, to avoid the rushing waters of the contrary Agulhas Current.

The exception was the Agoada de São Brás (Mossel Bay, South Africa), a watering stop after the Cape. It was not always used on the outbound journey since individual ships often charted wide routes around the Cape, and sighted coast again only well after this point. However, ships damaged during the crossing frequently had no choice but to put in there for emergency repairs. Trade for food supplies with the pastoral Khoikhoi peoples that lived in the area was frequent (although there were also occasional skirmishes). São Brás was a more frequent stop on the return journey, as a place to repair the ships before doubling the Cape the other way. As a result, particularly in early years, São Brás was used as a postal station, where messages from the returning armadas would be left for the outward armadas, reporting on the latest conditions in India.

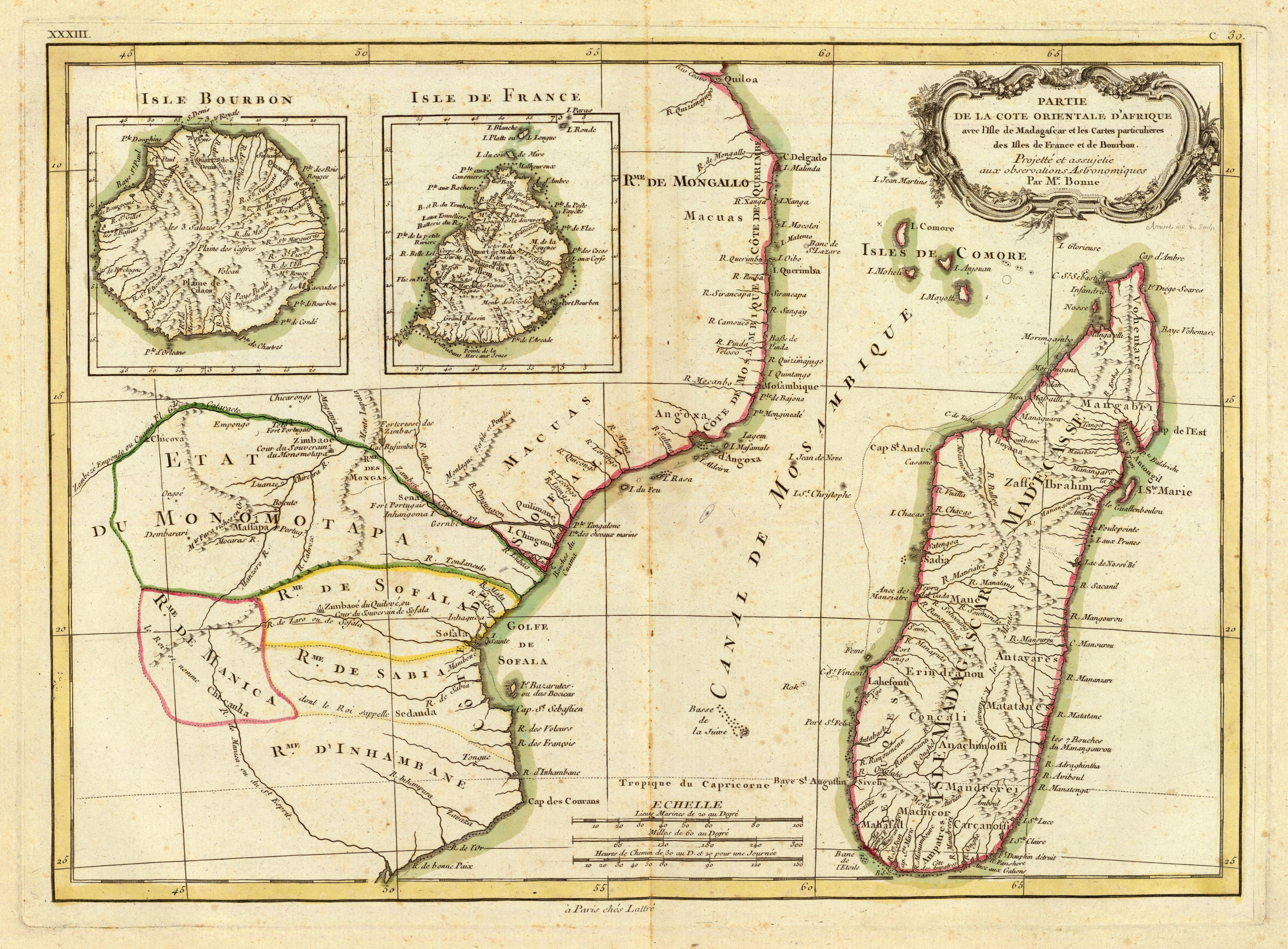
French map of Mozambique Channel, c. 1791

If the armada went by the inner route, then the next daunting obstacle was Cape Correntes, at the entrance of the Mozambique Channel. Treacherously fast waters, light winds alternating with unpredictably violent gusts, and dangerous shoals and rocks made this cape particularly dangerous. It is estimated that of all the ships lost on the India Run, nearly 30% of them capsized or ran aground around here - more than any other place.

The ideal passage through the Mozambique Channel would be to sail straight north through the middle of the channel, where a steady favorable wind could be relied upon at this season, but this was a particularly hard task in an era where longitude was determined largely by dead reckoning. If a pilot miscalculated and charted a course too close to the African coast, the current ran south, the winds were light or non-existent, subject to arbitrary gusts from strange directions, and the coasts were littered with shoals. (Note: Indeed, another reason ships steered clear away from the South African coast after crossing the Cape of Good Hope was precisely that the contrary Agulhas current threw off the dead reckoning calculations, and often misled pilots into turning too soon into the Mozambique channel, forcing them on a dangerous too-western route up the channel.) Into this dreaded mix, Cape Correntes added its own special terror to the experience. The Cape was not only a confluence point of opposing winds, which created unpredictable whirlwinds, it also produced a strange and extraordinarily fast southerly current, violent enough to break a badly-sewn ship, and confusing enough to throw all reckoning out the window and lure pilots into errors.

The temptation would be to err in the opposite direction, and keep on pushing east until the island of Madagascar was sighted, then move up the channel (the current here ran north), keeping the Madagascar coast in sight at all times. Although a Madagascar-hugging route cleared up the longitude problem, it was also abundant in fearful obstacles – coral islets, atolls, shoals, protruding rocks, submerged reefs, made for a particularly nerve-wracking experience to navigate, especially at night or in bad weather.

To avoid the worst consequences of doubling Cape Correntes, India ships stayed as far from the African coast as possible but not so close to Madagascar to run into its traps. To find the ideal middle route through the channel, pilots tended to rely on two dangerous longitude markers – the Bassas da India and the Europa rocks. Although conveniently situated in the middle of the channel, they were not always visible above the waves, so sailors often watched for hovering clusters of seabirds, which colonized these rocks, as an indicator of their location. Unfortunately, this was not a reliable method, and many an India ship ended up crashing on those rocks.

If they succeeded sailing up the middle channel, the India naus usually saw African coast again only around the bend of Angoche. If the ships were in a bad shape, they could stop at the Primeiras Islands (off Angoche) for urgent repairs. The Primeiras are a long row of uninhabited low coral islets – not much more than mounds above the waves – but they form a channel of calm waters between themselves and the mainland, a useful shelter for troubled ships.

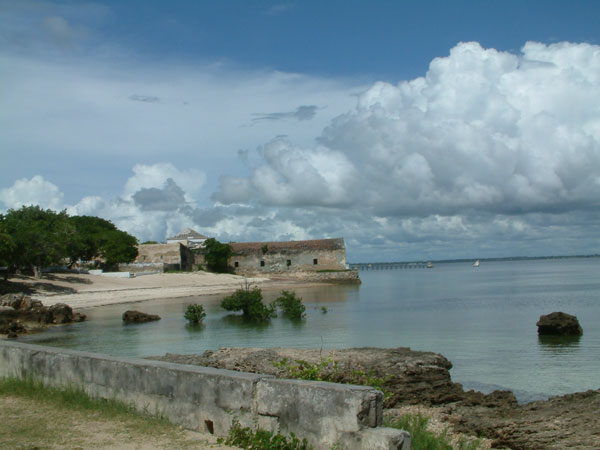
Mozambique Island, with Fort São Sebastião in background

The scheduled stop was a little further north on Mozambique Island, a coral island off the coast, with two outlying smaller islands (Goa Island, known as São Jorge, and the island of Sena). Mozambique's main attribute was its splendid harbor, which served as the usual first stop and collection point of Portuguese India armadas after the crossing of the Cape of Good Hope. The island had a town and a fortress, so some stock of supplies was usually at hand.

The conditions of the ships by the time they reached Mozambique was often woeful. With the occasional exception of Cape Santo Agostinho and Mossel Bay, there were no stops between Cape Verde and Mozambique Island, a long time for 16th-century ships to remain at sea without repairs, watering, or resupply. Already before the Cape, provisions had grown stale, scurvy and dysentery had often set in, and deaths of crews and passengers from disease had begun. The ship itself, so long at sea without re-caulking or re-painting, was in a fragile state. To then force the ship through the mast-cracking tempests of Cape of Good Hope, the seam-ripping violent waters of Cape Correntes and the rocks of the channel, turned this final stage into a horrible experience for all aboard.

Mozambique Island was originally an outpost of the Kilwa Sultanate, a collection of Muslim Swahili cities along the East African coast, centered at Kilwa, that formed a medieval commercial empire from Cape Correntes in the south to the Somali borderlands in the north, what is sometimes called the "Swahili Coast". The Kilwa Sultanate began disintegrating into independent city-states around the time of the Portuguese arrival (1500), a process speeded along by the intrigues and interventions of Portuguese captains.

The original object of Portuguese attentions had been the southerly Swahili city of Sofala, the main outlet of the Monomatapa gold trade, and the first Portuguese fortress in East Africa was erected there in 1505 (Fort São Caetano de Sofala). But Sofala's harbor was marred by a long moving sandbank and hazardous shoals, making it quite unsuitable as a stop for the India armadas. So in 1507, the 9th Portuguese India Armada (Mello, 1507) seized Mozambique Island and erected a fortress there (Fort São Gabriel, later replaced by Fort São Sebastião in 1558), to use its spacious and well-sheltered harbor.

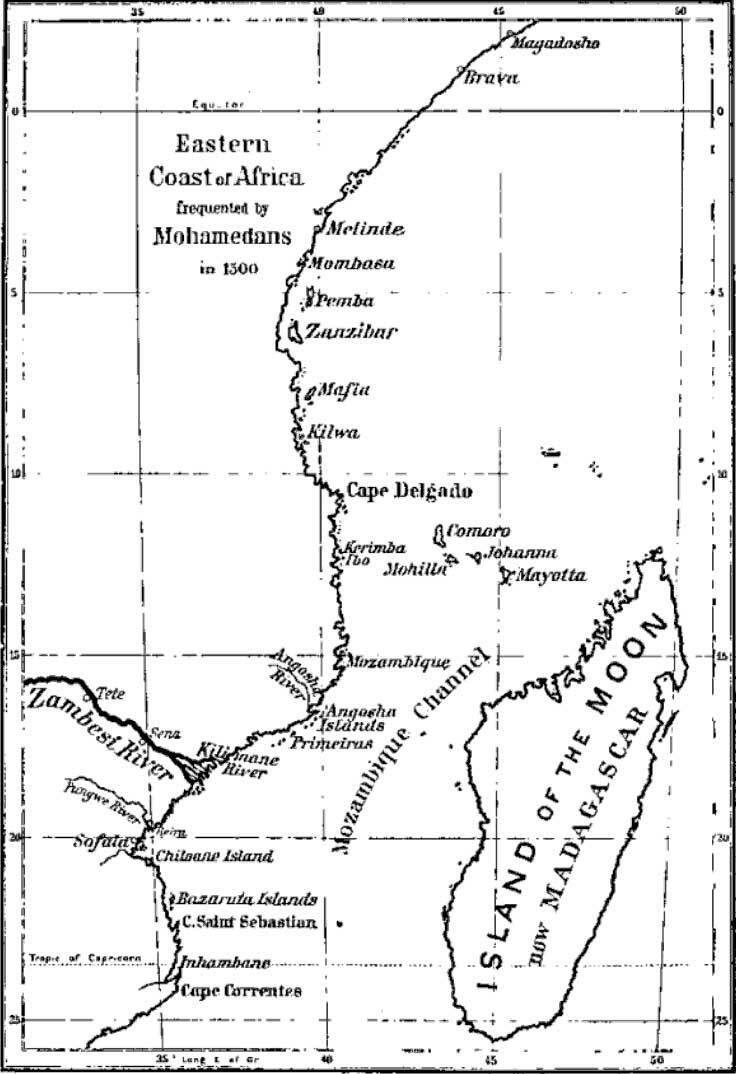
Principal cities of the Swahili Coast of East Africa, c. 1500.

The principal drawback was that Mozambique Island was parched and infertile. It produced practically nothing locally, and even had to ferry drinkable water by boat from elsewhere. Replenishing the islands was not a simple matter. Although Mozambique islanders had established watering holes, gardens and coconut palm groves (essential for timber) just across on the mainland (at Cabaceira inlet), the Bantu inhabitants of the area were generally hostile to both the Swahili and the Portuguese, and often prevented the collection of supplies. So ensuring Mozambique had sufficient supplies presented its own challenges. The Portuguese factors in Mozambique had to ensure enough supplies were shipped in from other points on the East African coast to Mozambique Island before the armada's scheduled arrival. The Mozambican factor also collected East African trade goods that could be picked up by the armadas and sold profitably in Indian markets – notably gold, ivory, copper, pearls and coral.

After Mozambique, the rule for the India armadas was generally to continue sailing north until they reached the equator latitude (the Seychelles islands, at 4ºS, were a common reference point). It was around here that the all-important southwesterly monsoon winds began to pick up. The armada would then sail east, and let the monsoon carry them headlong across the Indian Ocean until India, presuming the armada arrived at the equator sometime in August.

In Pimentel's (1746) estimation, ships had to leave Mozambique before August 25 to avail themselves of the summer monsoon. If, however, the armada arrived in the latter part of the season, say September, turning at the equator was a risky route. The southwesterly monsoon might be blowing in the right direction at the moment, but the ship ran the risk of not reaching a safe Indian port before the monsoon reversed direction (usually around late September to early October, when it became a northeasterly). So a late season ship was usually stuck in Africa until next April.

Notice that the trajectory, as described, skips over nearly all the towns on the East African coast north of Mozambique – Kilwa (Quíloa), Zanzibar, Mombasa (Mombaça), Malindi (Melinde), Barawa (Brava), Mogadishu (Magadoxo), etc. This is not to say Portuguese did not visit those locations – indeed, some even had Portuguese factories and forts (e.g. Fort Santiago in Kilwa, held from 1505 to 1512). But Portuguese armadas on their way to India did not have to stop at those locations, and so usually did not. The stop on Mozambique island was usually the only necessary one.

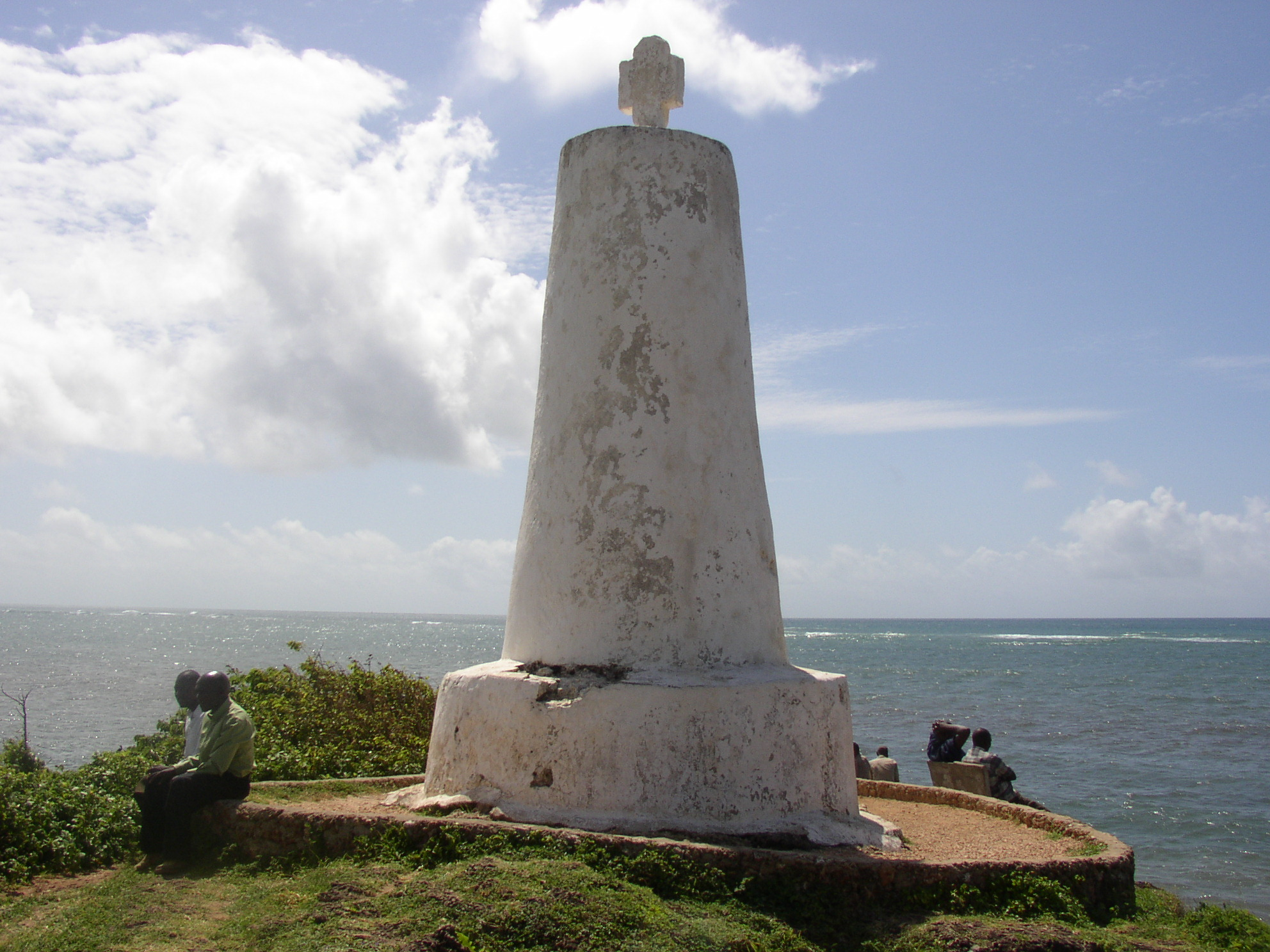
Padrão of Vasco da Gama, at Malindi, Kenya.

Nonetheless, if the armada had time, or got into trouble for some reason, the stopping choice was Malindi. A Portuguese ally since the earliest trip of Vasco da Gama in 1498, Malindi could usually be counted on to give a warm reception and had plenty of supplies. Unlike most other Swahili towns, Malindi was on the mainland and had an ample hinterlands with fertile cultivated fields, including groves of oranges and lemons (critical to combat scurvy). However, it had a poor harbor; although waters were kept calm by an offshore reef, the anchorage area was littered with shoals. It did, however, have a peculiar protruding rock that served as a decent natural pier for loading and unloading goods.

Malindi's other advantage was that, at 3º15'S, it was practically at exactly the right latitude to catch the southwesterly monsoon for an Indian Ocean crossing. Plenty of experienced Indian Ocean pilots – Swahili, Arab or Gujarati – could be found in the city, and Malindi was likely to have the latest news from across the sea, so it was a very convenient stop for the Portuguese before a crossing. However, stops take time, which, given the imminent monsoon reversal, was a scarce commodity. If the armada had been decently equipped enough at Mozambique island, a stop at Malindi, however delightful or useful, was an unnecessary and risky expenditure of time.

With the monsoon, Portuguese India armadas usually arrived in India in early September (sometimes late August). Because of the wind pattern, they usually made landfall around Anjediva island (Angediva). From there, the armada furled their square sails and proceed with lateen sails south along the Malabar coast of India to the city of Cochin (Cochim, Kochi) in Kerala. Cochin was the principal spice port accessible to the Portuguese, it had the earliest Portuguese factory and fort in India, and served as the headquarters of Portuguese government and operations in India for the first decades. However, this changed after the Portuguese conquest of Goa in 1510. The capture of Goa had been largely motivated by the desire to find a replacement for Anjediva as the first anchoring point for the armadas. Anjediva had proven itself to be far from ideal. The island was generally undersupplied – it contained only a few fishing villages – but the armada ships were often forced to sojourn there for long periods, usually for repair or to await for better winds to carry them down to Cochin. Anjediva island also lay in precarious pirate-infested waters, on the warring frontier between Muslim Bijapur and Hindu Vijaynagar, which frequently threatened it. The same winds which carried the armada down to Cochin prevented Portuguese squads from Cochin racing up to rescue it. The Portuguese had tried setting up a fort in Anjediva, but it was captured and dismantled by forces on behalf of Bijapur. As a result, the Portuguese governor Afonso de Albuquerque decided the nearby island-city of Goa was preferable and forcibly seized it in 1510. Thereafter Goa, with its better harbor and greater supply base, served as the first anchorage point of Portuguese armadas upon arriving in India. Although Cochin, with its important spice markets, remained the ultimate destination, and was still the official Portuguese headquarters in India until the 1530s, Goa was more favorably located relative to Indian Ocean wind patterns and served as its military-naval center. The docks of Goa were soon producing their own carracks for the India run back to Portugal and for runs to further points east.

=== Return voyage ===
The return voyage was shorter than the outbound. The fleet left India in December, picking up the northeast monsoon towards the African coast. Passing through the Mozambique Channel, the fleet kept close to land to avoid the westerlies and catch the Agulhas Current to round the Cape of Good Hope. Once in the Atlantic, it caught the southeast trade winds and sailed to the west of Ascension and Saint Helena as far as the doldrums. The fleet then sailed almost straight north to the Azores, where it caught the prevailing westerlies and sailed due east into Lisbon.

== Logistics of the armadas ==
=== Organization ===
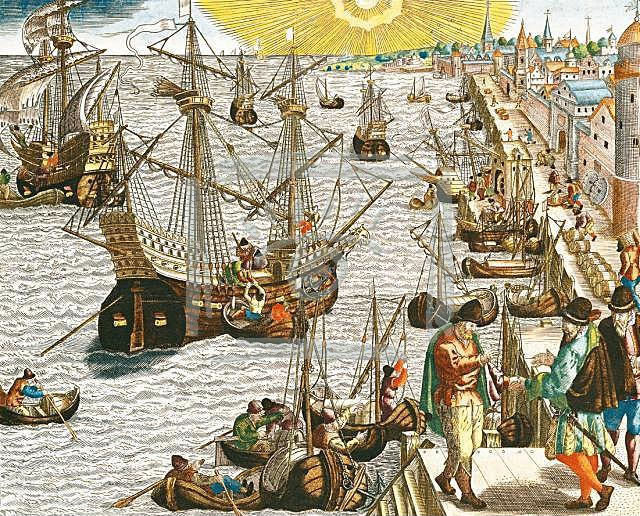
Departure of fleet for the Indies from Lisbon harbor, by Theodor de Bry, 1592

The size of the armada varied, from enormous fleets of over twenty ships to small ones of as few as four. This changed over time. In the first decade (1500–1510), when the Portuguese were establishing themselves in India, the armadas averaged around fifteen ships per year. This declined to around ten from 1510–1525. From 1526 to the 1540s, the armadas declined further to 7-8 ships per year — with a few exceptional cases of large armadas (e.g. 1533, 1537, 1547) brought about by military exigency, but also several years of exceptionally small fleets. In the second half of the 16th century, the Portuguese India armada stabilized at 5-6 ships annually, with very few exceptions (above seven in 1551 and 1590, below 4 in 1594 and 1597).

Organization was principally in the hands of the Casa da Índia, the royal trading house established around 1500 by King Manuel I of Portugal. The Casa was in charge of monitoring the crown monopoly on India trade – receiving goods, collecting duties, assembling, maintaining and scheduling the fleets, contracting private merchants, correspondence with the feitorias (overseas factories), drafting documents and handling legal matters.

Separately from the Casa, but working in coordination with it, was the Armazém das Índias, the royal agency in charge of nautical outfitting, that oversaw the Lisbon docks and naval arsenal. The Armazém was responsible for the training of pilots and sailors, ship construction and repair, and the procurement and provision of naval equipment – sails, ropes, guns, instruments and, most importantly, maps. The piloto-mor ('chief pilot') of the Armazém, in charge of pilot-training, was, up until 1548, also the keeper of the Padrão Real, the secret royal master map, incorporating all the cartographic details reported by Portuguese captains and explorers, and upon which all official nautical charts were based. The screening and hiring of crews was the function of the provedor of the Armazém.

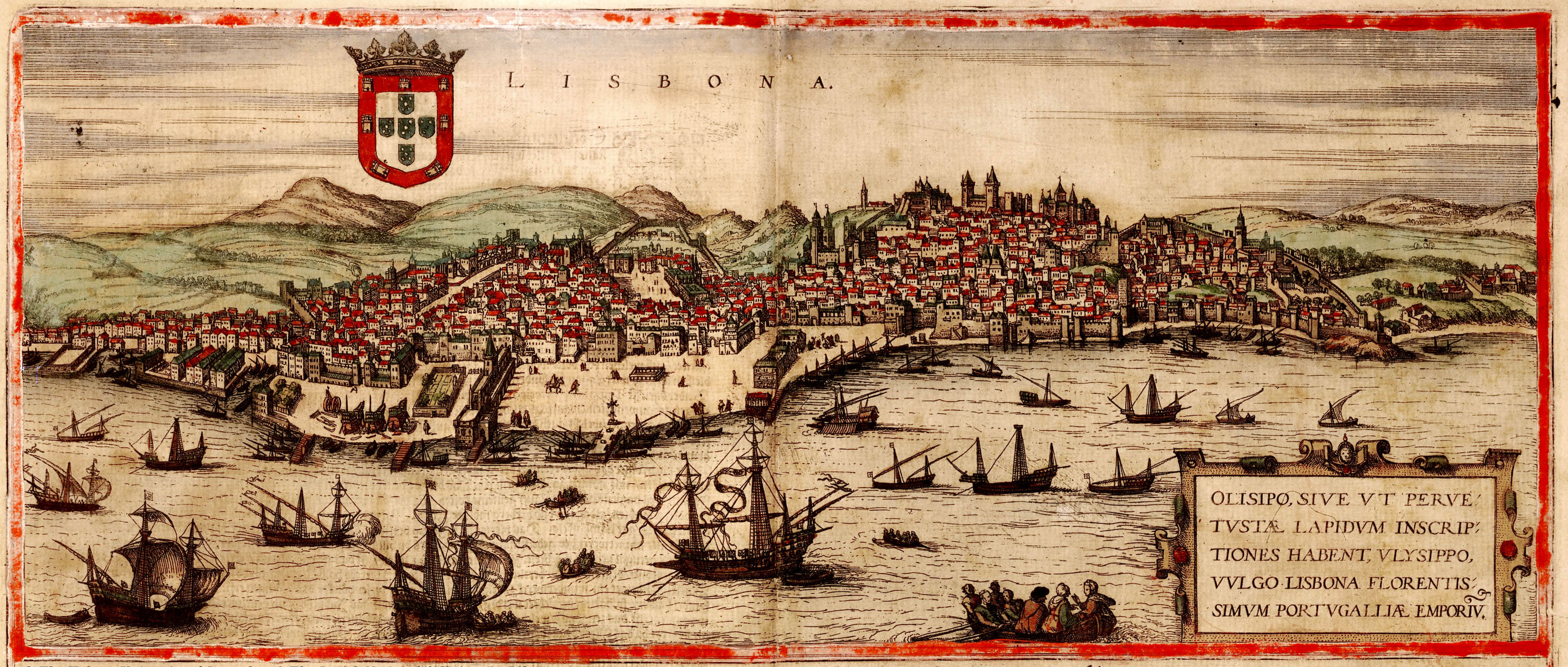
Ribeira Palace in the foreground of this view of the city of Lisbon, Portugal from Georg Braun and Frans Hogenberg's atlas Civitates orbis terrarum, 1572

From at least 1511 (perhaps earlier), the offices of the Casa da India were based in the ground floor of the royal Ribeira Palace, by the Terreiro do Paço in Lisbon, with the Armazém nearby. (Neither the Casa nor the Armazem should be confused with the Estado da Índia, the Portuguese colonial government in India, which was separate and reported directly to the monarch.)

Ships could be and sometimes were owned and outfitted by private merchants, and these were incorporated into the India armada. However, the expenses of outfitting a ship were immense, and few native Portuguese merchants had the wherewithal to finance one, despite eager government encouragement. In the early India runs, there are several ships organized by private consortiums, often with foreign capital provided by wealthy Italian and German trading houses. This fluctuated over time, as the royal duties, costs of outfitting and rate of attrition and risk of loss on India runs were sometimes too high for private houses to bear. Private Portuguese merchants did, however, routinely contract for cargo, carried aboard crown ships for freight charges.

Marine insurance was still underdeveloped, although the Portuguese had helped pioneer its development and its practice seemed already customary. (Note: In May, 1293, King Denis of Portugal had established the Sociedade de Mercadores Portugueses (Society of Portuguese Merchants), with mutual help clauses that formed the kernel of marine insurance contracts, similar to those in practice in Italian ports such as Genoa and Pisa. In 1380 Ferdinand I established a shipping company (Companhia das Naus), with a compulsory insurance scheme, whereby member-merchants (essentially all shipowners and merchants outfitting ships above 50t) to contribute a fixed rate of 2% of freight revenue as a premium to a central fund (Bolsa de Seguros), from which claim payouts would be redistributed. Around 1488, Pedro de Santarém (Petrus Santerna), a Portuguese consul in Italy, wrote perhaps the first treatise, De assecurationibus (published 1552–53), outlining the theory and principles behind marine insurance. Around 1578, Cardinal-King Henry established the Consulado, a tribunal explicitly dedicated to decide marine insurance cases (initially suppressed by the Iberian Union of 1580, the tribunal was resurrected by Philip II of Spain in 1593, with the modification that a private marine insurance contract had to have the signature of a royal official (comissário de seguros), to be valid in the law courts). This formed the framework for marine insurance in which the India Armadas operated. Later developments include the establishment of an insurance house (Casa de Seguros) as an organ of the Junta do Comércio Geral (Board of General Trade) by regent-prince Peter II of Portugal in 1668, subsequently replaced by the Mesa do Bem Comum do Comércio (Board of Common Trade Welfare) in 1720. Around 1750, the Marquis de Pombal persuaded the monarch to fold the older house into a new entity, the Real Junta do Comércio (Royal Board of Trade). (DeSouza, 1977).)

=== Ships ===
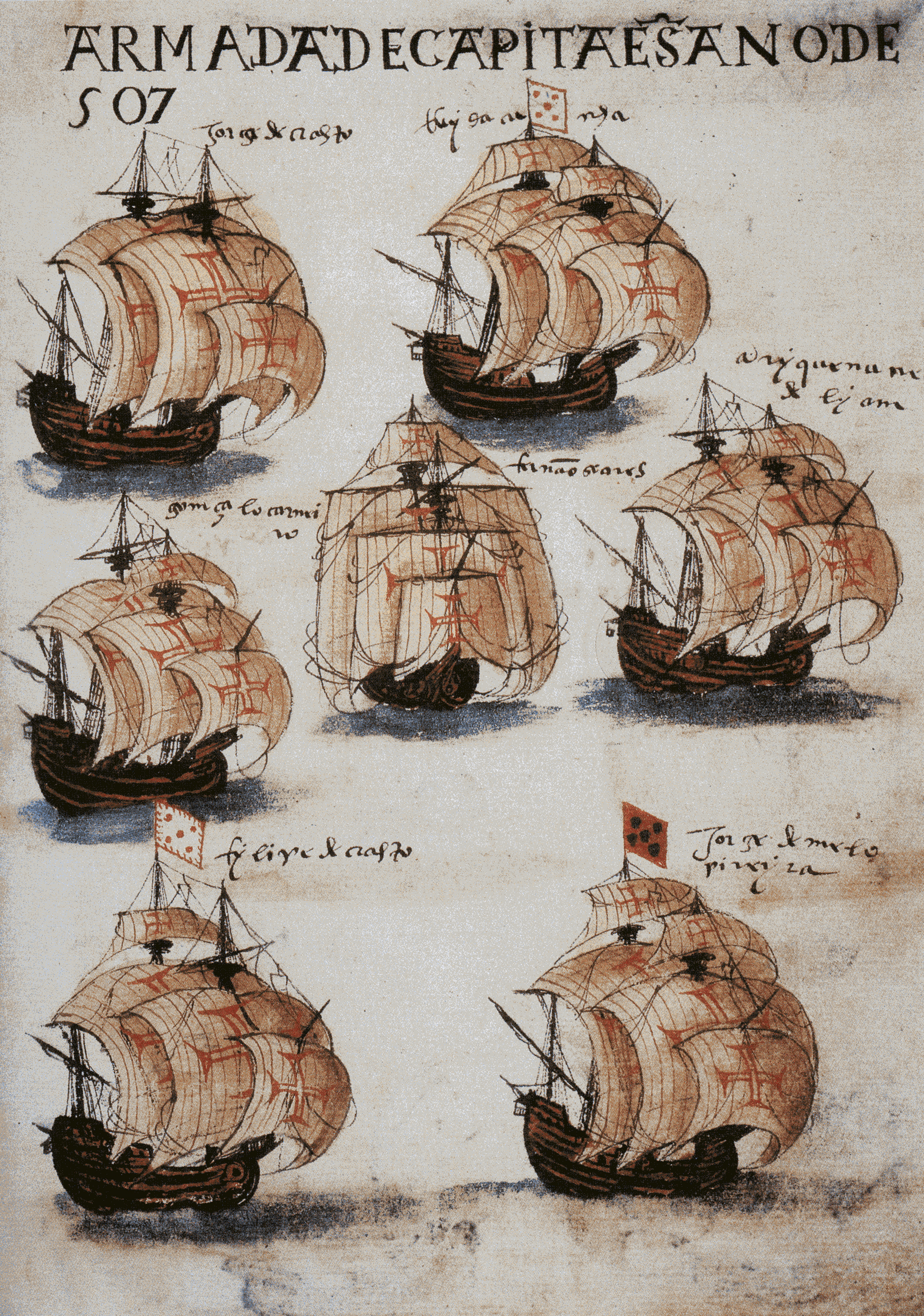
Carracks of the India Armada of 1507, from the Livro de Lisuarte de Abreu

The ships of an India armada were typically carracks (naus), with sizes that grew over time. The first carracks were modest ships, rarely exceeding 100 tons, carrying only up to 40–60 men; for example, the São Gabriel of Gama's 1497 fleet, one of the largest of the time, was only 120 tons. But this was quickly increased as the India run got underway. In the 1500 Cabral armada, the largest carracks, Cabral's flagship and the El-Rei, are reported to have been somewhere between 240 and 300 tons. The Flor de la Mar, built in 1502, was a 400-ton nau, while at least one of the naus of the Albuquerque armada of 1503 is reported to have been as large as 600 tons. The rapid doubling and tripling of the size of Portuguese carracks in a few years reflected the needs of the India runs. The rate of increase tapered off thereafter. For much of the remainder of the 16th century, the average carrack on the India run was probably around 400 tons.

In the 1550s, during the reign of John III, a few 900-ton behemoths were built for India runs, in the hope that larger ships would provide economies of scale. The experiment turned out poorly. Not only was the cost of outfitting such a large ship disproportionately high, they proved unmaneuverable and unseaworthy, particularly in the treacherous waters of the Mozambique Channel. Three of the new behemoths were quickly lost on the southern African coast – the São João (900 tons, built 1550, wrecked 1552), the São Bento (900 tons, built 1551, wrecked 1554) and the largest of them all, the Nossa Senhora da Graça (1,000 tons, built 1556, wrecked 1559).

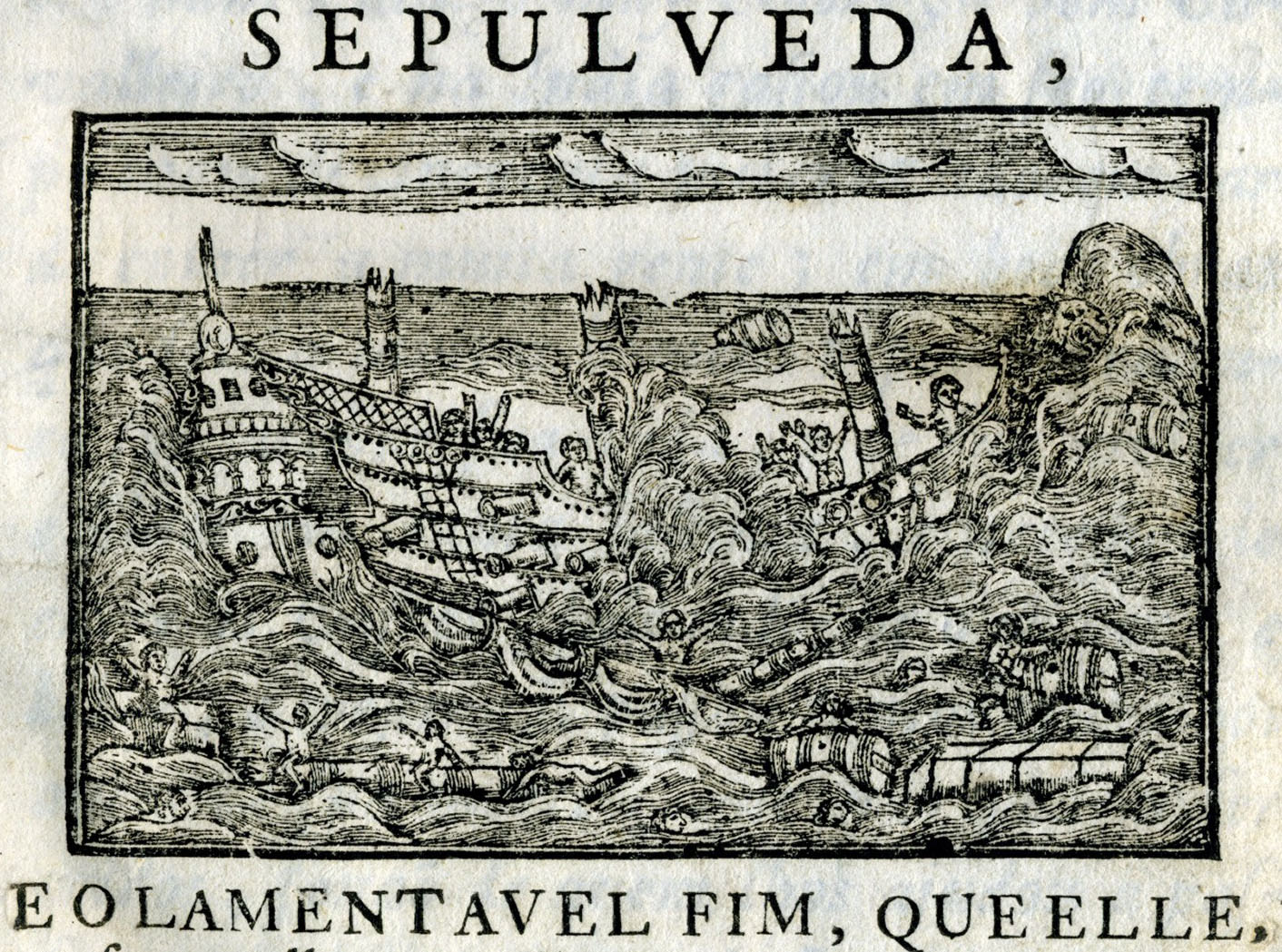
Wreck of the São João, a large 900 t India carrack (or great galleon), off the coast of South Africa, 1552.

These kind of losses prompted King Sebastian to issue an ordinance in 1570 setting the upper limit to the size of India naus at 450 tons. Nonetheless, after the Iberian Union of 1580, this regulation would be ignored and shipbuilders, probably urged on by merchants hoping to turn around more cargo on every trip, pushed for larger ships. The size of India naus accelerated again, averaging 600 tons in the 1580–1600 period, with several spectacularly large naus of 1500 tons or greater making their appearance in the 1590s.

If the lesson was not quite learned then, it was certainly learned in August, 1592, when English privateer Sir John Burroughs (alt. Burrows, Burgh) captured the Madre de Deus in the waters around the Azores islands (see Battle of Flores). The Madre de Deus, built in 1589, was a 1600-ton carrack, with seven decks and a crew of around 600. It was the largest Portuguese ship to go on an India run. The great carrack, under the command of Fernão de Mendonça Furtado, was returning from Cochin with a full cargo when it was captured by Burrough. The value of the treasure and cargo taken on this single ship is estimated to have been equivalent to half the entire treasury of the English crown. The loss of so much cargo in one swoop confirmed, once again, the folly of building such gigantic ships. The carracks built for the India run returned to their smaller size after the turn of the century.

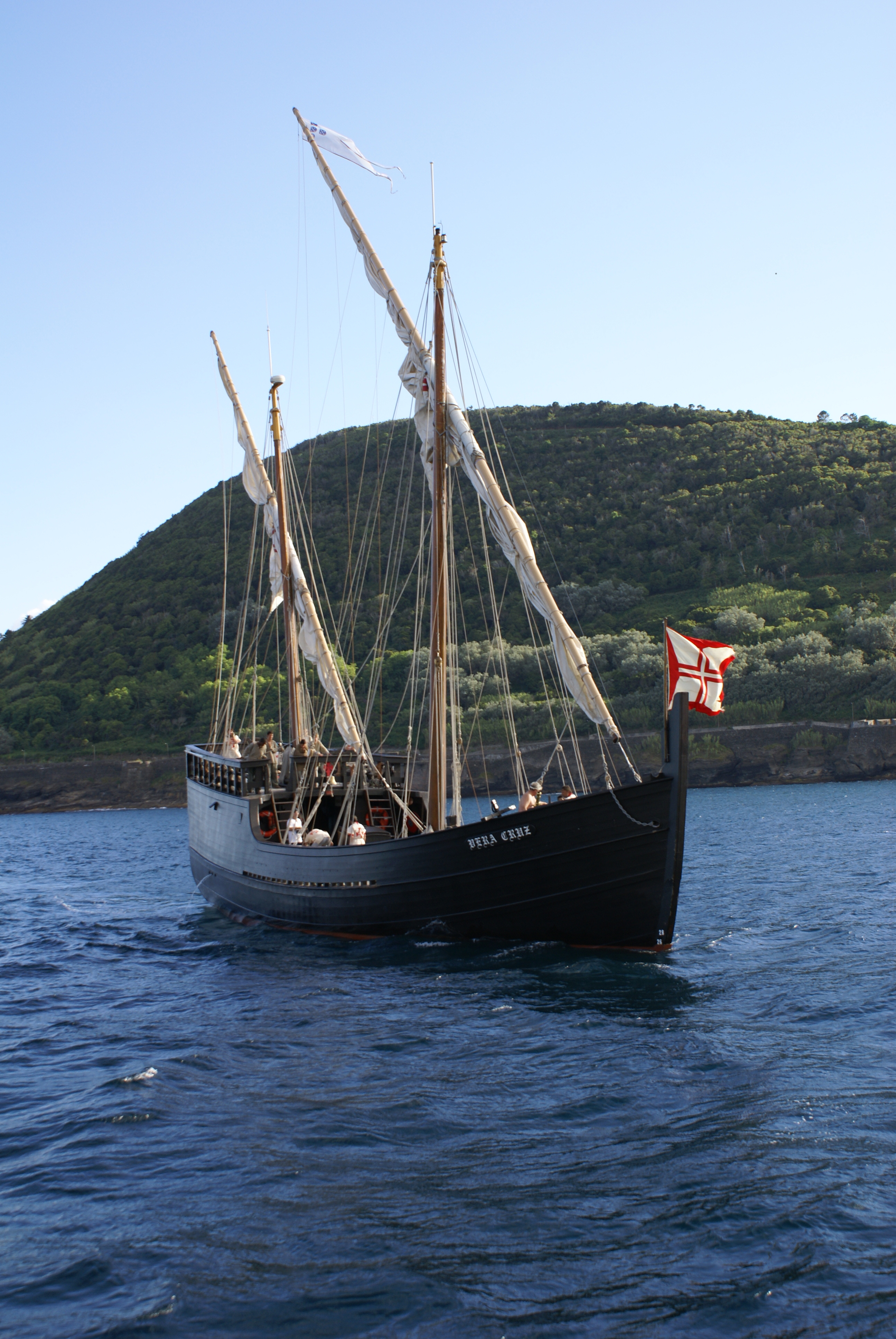
Modern replica of a lateen-rigged caravel

In the early Carreira da India, the carracks were usually accompanied by smaller caravels (caravelas), averaging 50–70 tons (rarely reaching 100), and capable of holding 20–30 men at most. Whether lateen-rigged (latina) or square-rigged (redonda), these shallow-drafted, nimble vessels had a myriad of uses. Caravels served as forward lamp, scouts and fighting ships of the convoy. Caravels on the India run were often destined to remain overseas for coastal patrol duty, rather than return with the main fleet.

In the course of the 16th century, caravels were gradually phased out in favor of a new escort/fighting ship, the galleon (galeão), which could range anywhere between 100 and 1000 tons. Based on the design of the carrack, but slenderer and lower, with forecastle diminished or removed to make way for its famous 'beak', the galleon became the principal fighting ship of the India fleet. It was not as nimble as the caravel, but could be mounted with much more cannon. With the introduction of the galleon, carracks became almost exclusively cargo ships (which is why they were pushed to such large sizes), leaving any fighting to be done to the galleons. One of the largest and most famous of Portuguese galleons was the São João Baptista (nicknamed Botafogo, 'spitfire'), a 1,000-ton galleon built in 1534, said to have carried 366 guns.

Many fleets also brought small supply ships on outward voyage. These were destined to be scuttled along the way once the supplies were consumed. The crews were redistributed and the abandoned ships usually burned to recover their iron nails and fittings.

The average speed of an India Armada was around 2.5 knots, but some ships could achieve speeds of between 8 and 10 for some stretches.

=== Seaworthiness ===
Portuguese India ships distinguished themselves from the ships of other navies (especially those of rival powers in the Indian Ocean) on two principal accounts: their seaworthiness (durability at sea) and their artillery.

With a few exceptions (e.g. Flor de la Mar, Santa Catarina do Monte Sinai), Portuguese India naus were not typically built to last longer than four or five years of useful service. That a nau managed to survive a single India run was already an achievement, given that few ships of any nation at the time were able to stay at sea for even a quarter as long without breaking apart at the seams.

The success of the India nau depended on 15th-century innovations in Portuguese shipbuilding that greatly improved the seaworthiness and longevity of the ship. Notable among these were the use of iron nails (rather than wooden pegs) to hold planks, the mixing of lead in the seams, and a caulking technique that improved upon traditional oakum with 'galagala' paste (a mixture of oakum, lime and olive oil, producing a kind of putty that could be pressed between the planks). Hulls were amply coated in pitch and pine tar (imported in bulk amounts from northern Germany), giving the India naus their famous (and, to some observers, sinister) dark tone.

=== Artillery ===
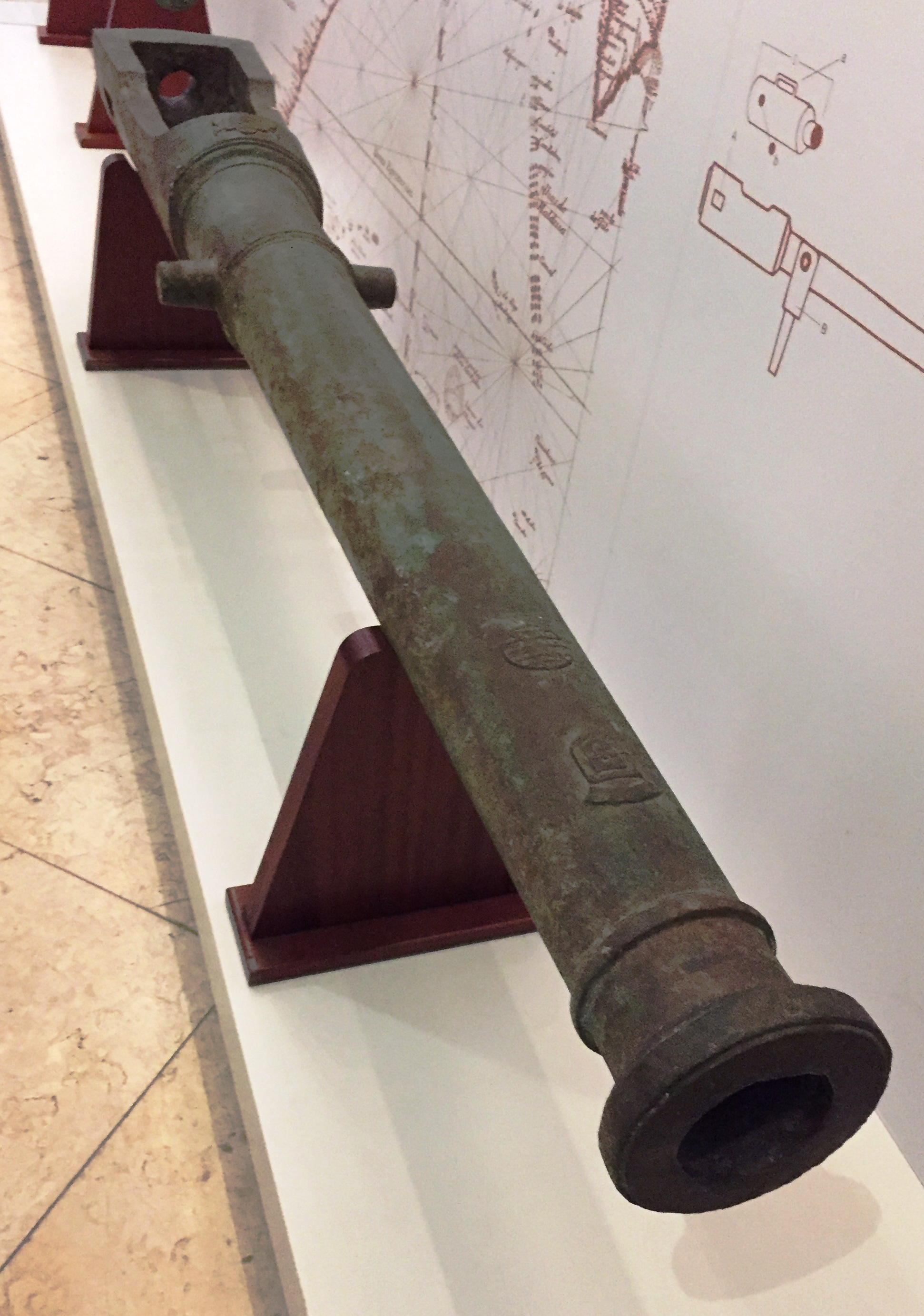
Portuguese breech-loading falconete, reign of King Sebastian

Naval artillery was the single greatest advantage the Portuguese held over their rivals in the Indian Ocean – indeed over most other navies – and the Portuguese crown spared no expense in procuring and producing the best naval guns European technology permitted.

King John II of Portugal, while still a prince in 1474, is often credited for pioneering the introduction of a reinforced deck on the old Henry-era caravel to allow the mounting of heavy guns. In 1489, he introduced the first standardized teams of trained naval gunners (bombardeiros) on every ship, and development of naval tactics that maximized broadside cannonades rather than the rush-and-grapple of Medieval galleys.

The Portuguese crown appropriated the best cannon technology available in Europe, particularly the new, more durable and far more accurate bronze cannon developed in Central Europe, replacing the older, less accurate wrought-iron cannon. By 1500, Portugal was importing vast volumes of copper and cannon from northern Europe, and had established itself as the leading producer of advanced naval artillery in its own right. Being a crown industry, cost considerations did not curb the pursuit of the best quality, best innovations and best training. The crown paid wage premiums and bonuses to lure the best European artisans and gunners (mostly German) to advance the industry in Portugal. Every cutting-edge innovation introduced elsewhere was immediately appropriated into Portuguese naval artillery, including bronze cannon (Flemish/German), breech-loading swivel-guns (probably of German origin), truck carriages (possibly English), and the idea (originally French, c. 1501) of cutting square gun ports (portinhola) in the hull to allow heavy cannon to be mounted below deck.

In this respect, the Portuguese spearheaded the evolution of modern naval warfare, moving away from the medieval warship, a carrier of armed men, aiming for the grapple, towards the modern idea of a floating artillery piece dedicated to resolving battles by gunnery alone.

According to Gaspar Correia, the typical fighting caravel of Gama's 4th Armada (1502) carried 30 men, four heavy guns below, six falconets (falconete) above (two fixed astern) and ten swivel-guns (canhão de berço) on the quarterdeck and bow.

An armed carrack, by contrast, had six heavy guns below, eight falconets above and several swivel-guns, and two fixed forward-firing guns before the mast. Although an armed carrack carried more firepower than a caravel, it was much less swift and less maneuverable, especially when loaded with cargo. A carrack's guns were primarily defensive, or for shore bombardments, whenever their heavier firepower was necessary. But by and large, fighting at sea was usually left to the armed caravels. The development of the heavy galleon removed even the necessity of bringing carrack firepower to bear in most circumstances.

=== Losses ===
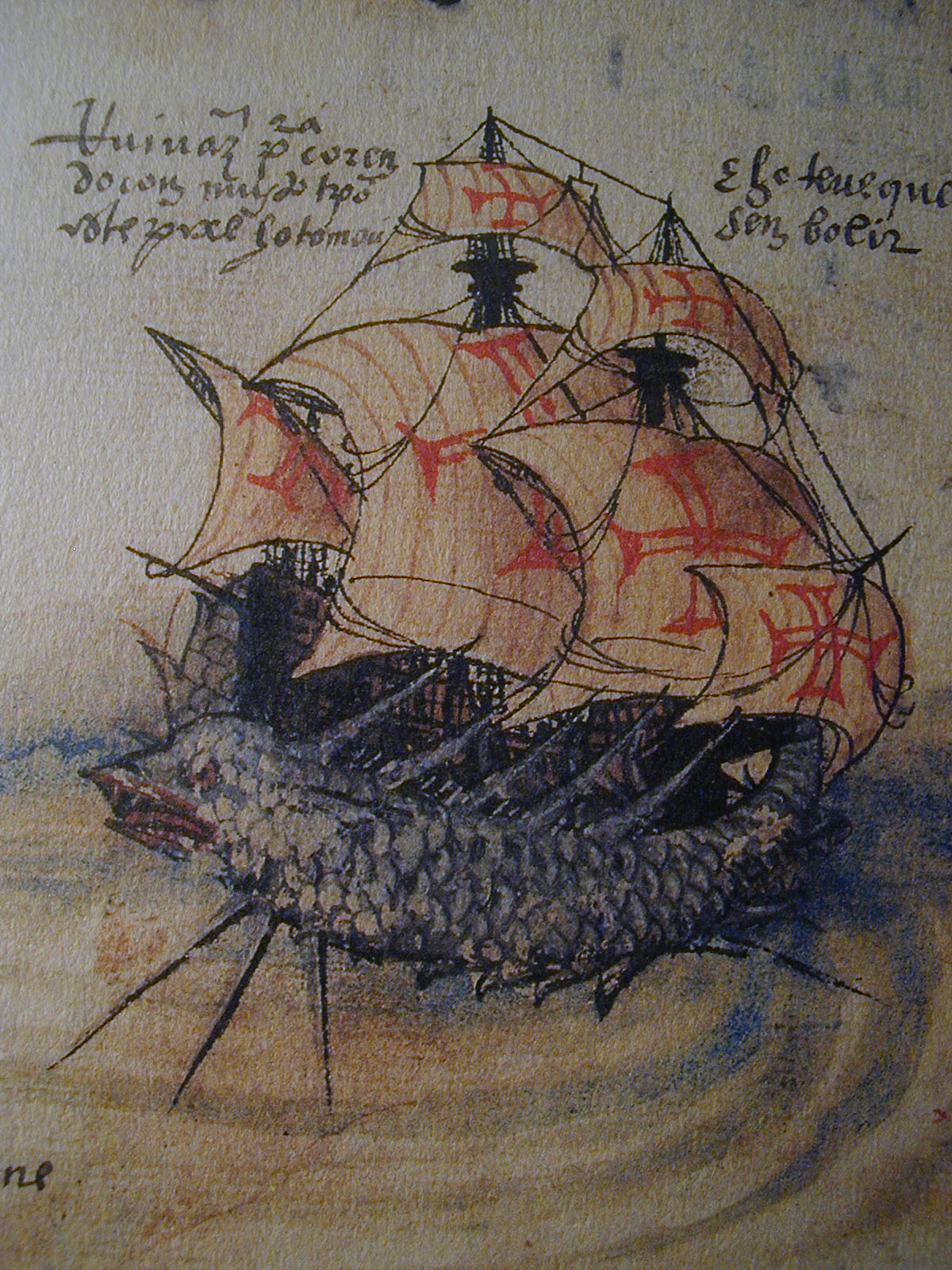
Sea-monster depicted in the Livro de Lisuarte de Abreu

According to historian Oliveira Martins, of the 806 naus sent on the India Run between 1497 and 1612, 425 returned safely to Portugal, 20 returned prematurely (i.e. without reaching India), 66 were lost, 4 were captured by the enemy, 6 were scuttled and burnt, and 285 remained in India (which went on to meet various fates of their own in the East.)

The loss rate was higher in certain periods than others, reflecting greater or lesser attention and standards of shipbuilding, organization, supervision, training, etc. which reveals itself in shoddily-built ships, overloaded cargo, incompetent officers, as well as the expected higher dangers of wartime. The rates fluctuated dramatically. By one estimate, in 1571–1575, 90% of India ships returned safely; by 1586–1590, the success rate fell to less than 40%; between 1596 and 1605, the rate climbed above 50% again, but in the subsequent years fell back to around 20%.

That only four ships on India runs were known to be captured by the enemy seems quite astonishing. These were:

- (1) 1508, the ship of Jó Queimado, originally part of the 8th Portuguese India Armada (Cunha, 1506) of Tristão da Cunha that set out in 1506. It was captured in 1508 by the French corsair Mondragon (said by one account to be in the Mozambique Channel, but it is unlikely Mondragon would have taken the trouble of doubling the Cape; it was more likely captured on the Atlantic side, probably near the Azores). Mondragon was himself tracked down and taken prisoner by Duarte Pacheco Pereira in January, 1509, off Cape Finisterre.
- (2) 1525, Santa Catarina do Monte Sinai, the great carrack built in Goa in 1512. It had been used to carry Vasco da Gama in 1523 to serve as the new viceroy of India, and was on its way back to Portugal in 1525, with the former governor D. Duarte de Menezes, when it was taken by French corsairs. (However, some have speculated that there was no foreign attack, that Menezes himself simply decided to go piratical and took command of the ship.)
- (3) 1587, São Filipe, returning from an India run, was captured by English privateer Sir Francis Drake, off the Azores. The triumph of the São Filipe cargo, one of the wealthiest hoards ever captured, was overshadowed only by the even wealthier trove of paperwork and maps detailing the Portuguese trade in Asia which fell into English hands. This set in motion the first English expedition to India, under Sir James Lancaster in 1591.
- (4) 1592 Madre de Deus, the gigantic carrack captured by Sir John Burroughs near the Azores, already described above.

This does not count, of course, ships that were attacked by enemy action and subsequently capsized or destroyed. It also does not count ships that were captured later in the East Indies (i.e. not on the India route at the time). The most famous of these was probably the mighty Portuguese carrack Santa Catarina (not to be confused with its earlier Mount Sinai namesake), captured in 1603, by Dutch captain Jacob van Heemskerk. The Santa Catarina was on a Portuguese Macau to Portuguese Malacca run with a substantial cargo of Sino-Japanese wares, most notably a small fortune in musk, when it was captured by Heemskerk in Singapore. The captured cargo nearly doubled the capital of the fledgling Dutch VOC.

Ships losses should not be confused with crew losses from disease, deprivation, accident, combat and desertion. These tended to be horrifically high – one third, or even as much as one half, even in good years.

=== Crews ===
The banner of the Order of Christ became a popular, and de facto, naval and war ensign amongst captains below the rank of Viceroy (who flew the royal banner), since many notable Portuguese captains belonged to that order.

The admiral of an armada, necessarily a nobleman of some degree, was known as the capitão-mor (captain-major), with full jurisdiction over the fleet. There was also usually a designated soto-capitão (vice-admiral), with a commission to assume command should tragedy befall the captain-major. The vice-admirals were also useful if a particular armada needed to be split into separate squadrons. If an armada carried a viceroy or governor of the Indies, he typically assumed the senior position (although in practice many delegated the decision-making during the journey to their flagship's captain).

Each India ship had a capitão (captain). As the position of captain could be quite profitable, it became quite attractive to lesser nobles and men of ambition hoping for a quick and easy fortune. The crown was often happy to 'sell' captain positions on India runs as a form of royal patronage to candidates with little or no experience at sea. Nonetheless, the captain was formally the king's representative and highest authority on his ship. Everyone, even noble passengers of greater formal rank, were under his jurisdiction. The supremacy of a captain's authority was curtailed only if the captain-major came aboard his ship, and when he docked in Goa (jurisdiction passed to the Vice-Roy or Governor).

Another important figure on an India ship was the escrivão (clerk), the de facto royal agent. The clerk was in charge of the written record of everything on the ship, especially the cargo inventory, which he tracked with meticulous precision. The clerk was carefully screened by the Casa da Índia, and was the crown's most trusted agent on board ship, and expected to keep an eye for crown interests. This gave him, in practice, a greater authority on the ship than his formal title suggests. At departure, the clerk was presented with the keys to the porão (hold) and a royal signet to seal the cargo. Nobody, not even the captain, was allowed to visit the cargo hold without the clerk present. It is said that rations could not be distributed, nor even a cup of water drawn from a barrel, without notifying the clerk. Upon the capture of an enemy ship, the clerk was immediately escorted aboard the captured vessel to seal the holds, cabins and chests, and take inventory of the loot.

Technical command of the ship was in the hands of the piloto (who combined the roles of pilot and navigator) and his assistant, the soto-piloto (second or under-pilot). The pilot and his assistant not merely steered the ship, but were responsible for all navigational matters – charts, instruments, plotting the course, etc. As captains were often quite inexperienced, the pilot was usually the highest trained naval officer aboard. Captains frequently deferred to them on the running of the ship.

Lacking a formal navigation school, early pilots were trained by apprenticeship. New pilots received their instruction, both practical and theoretical, first-hand from master pilots aboard ship and kept a tight lid on their professional secrets. This changed in the late 1550s or early 1560s, with the establishment of formal courses of instruction for India pilots in Lisbon by the cosmógrafo-mor Pedro Nunes, which included a final examination and formal certification.

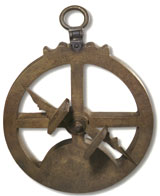
The mariner's astrolabe was developed shortly before 1500 and found its first use in early Portuguese India Armadas

Despite their general secretiveness, several early India pilots compiled written navigation manuals, probably initially merely as notes for themselves, but eventually passed on and copied by others. These included general instructions on how to read, plot and follow routes by nautical chart, how to use the principal nautical instruments of the day – the mariner's compass, the quadrant, the astrolabe, the nocturlabe and the balestilha (cross-staff) – and astronomical tables (notably that of solar declination, derived from Abraham Zacuto and later Pedro Nunes's own) to correctly account for "compass error" (the deviation of the magnetic north from the true north) by recourse to the Pole Star, Sun and Southern Cross, the flux and reflux of tides, etc. These manuals often contained a roteiro (rutter), giving the detailed instructions (by geographical coordinates and physical description) of the routes to India. Two of the few which have survived were Duarte Pacheco Pereira's Esmeraldo de Situ Orbis (c. 1509) and João de Lisboa's Livro da Marinharia (c. 1514).

Relative to the ships of other nations (e.g. French, Dutch), clerks and pilots on Portuguese vessels held an unusually high degree of authority.

Next in a ship's hierarchy was the mestre (master). The ship's master was the officer in charge of all sailors, ship's boys and the rest of the crew. His primary job at sea was to ensure the crew implemented the technical manoeuvre orders of the pilot – raising and lowering sails, etc. As such, the master required a good degree of sailing knowledge – knowing how to translate the pilot's instructions into sail & crew instructions. He was often sufficiently trained in navigation to take over pilot's duties if the pilot and under-pilot were incapacitated. But a ship which lost all three officers would usually be in serious trouble.

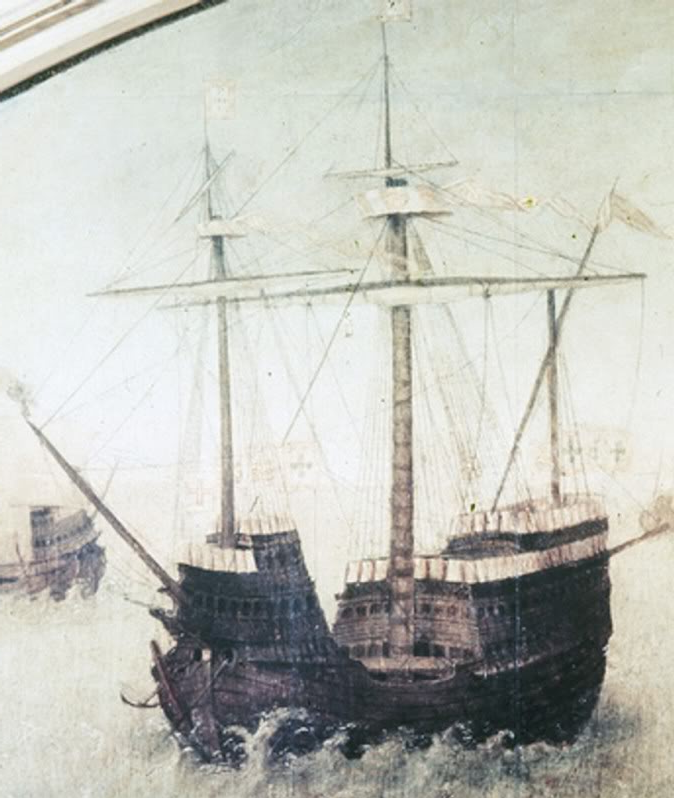
Portuguese carrack

Assisting the master, was the contramestre (or soto-mestre, boatswain). The boatswain was the crew enforcer – he ensured the master's orders were implemented by the crew. In practice, they usually partitioned the deck between them, with the master in charge of implementation in the stern, and the boatswain in the bow. The boatswain was also in charge of the maintenance of rigging, anchors and supervising the loading and unloading of cargo, etc. The boatswain had his own assistant, the guardião (boatswain's mate).

The bulk of the crew were all-purpose sailors – usually half of them marinheiros (seamen), the other half grumetes (ship-boys). The partition between the two classes was akin to the modern distinction between able seaman and ordinary seamen, e.g. ship-boys were assigned the drudgery duties, swabbing and scrubbing, moving cargo, etc., while seamen would be given 'higher' responsibilities, e.g. assigned to hold the wheel on the tolda (quarterdeck). The boatswain was considered the head of the seamen, and served as the intermediary between the seamen and the higher officers (master, pilot, etc.). The boatswain's mate had authority only over the ship-boys; seamen would not obey a boatswain's mate's order.

Then there were the specialized crew. A Portuguese India nau usually had two estrinqueiros, skilled sailors in charge of the windlass that operated the round sails (one for the main mast, another for the fore mast). The meirinho (bailiff), a judicial officer, was in charge of dispensing punishment and supervising on-board dangers (fires, gunpowder stores, weapon caches). The capelão (chaplain) was in charge of saving souls, the barbeiro (barber surgeon) in charge of saving lives. A large nau usually had a number of pagens (pages), who not only attended upon the officers and the cabins, but also served as runners delivering orders across the deck.

The despenseiro (purser/steward) was in charge of food stores and rations. Unlike ships of other nations, Portuguese vessels did not usually have a cook aboard, sailors were expected to cook their own meals themselves at the ship's ovens. Rations were composed primarily of ship's biscuits (the main staple, rationed at 2 pounds per person per day). Other provisions included wine, salt, olive oil, salted cod, sardines, pork, cheese, rice, and the like, with fresh fruits and vegetables available on the initial part of the journey. Rations were suspended if the ship was at dock and the men ashore. On the return journey, the crown would only supply enough biscuit and water for a ship to reach the Cape of Good Hope; the ship's crew would have to find its own provisions thereafter.

Perhaps the most valued of the specialized positions was the repair crew. This was usually composed of two carpinteiros (carpenters ) and two calafate (caulkers) that fixed anything that was broken, plus the tanoeiro (cooper), who ensured the cargo and water stores remained preserved. A nau might also have mergulhadores (divers), crew specially trained to go down the outside of the ship to check and help repair hull damage below the water level.

Military personnel aboard a nau varied with the mission. Except for some specialists and passengers, most of the crew was armed before encounters and expected to fight. But every nau also had, at the very least, a small specialized artillery crew of around ten bombardeiros (gunners), under the command of a condestável (constable). As naval artillery was the single most important advantage the Portuguese had over rival powers in the Indian Ocean, gunners were highly trained and enjoyed a bit of an elite status on the ship. (Indeed, many gunners on Portuguese India ships were highly skilled foreigners, principally Germans, lured into Portuguese service with premium wages and bonuses offered by crown agents.)

Ships that expected more military encounters might also carry homens d'armas (men-at-arms), espingardeiros (arquebusiers/musketeers) and besteiros (crossbowmen). But, except for the gunners, soldiers aboard ship were not regarded as an integral part of the naval crew, but rather just as passengers.

The following is a sample composition of a typical 16th-century Portuguese India nau (carrack):

- 1 captain (capitão)
- 1 clerk (escrivão)
- 1 chaplain (capelão)
- 2 pilots (piloto, soto-piloto)
- 1 master (mestre)
- 1 boatswain (contramestre)
- 1 boatswain's mate (guardião)
- 2 windlass operators (estrinqueiros)
- 45 seamen (marinheiros)
- 48 ship-boys (grumetes)
- 4 pages (pagems)
- 2 carpenters (carpinteiro and carpinteiro sobressalente)
- 2 caulkers (calafate and calafate sobressalente)
- 1 cooper (tanoeiro)
- 1 steward (despenseiro)
- 1 bailiff (meirinho)
- 1 barber-surgeon (barbeiro)
- 1 constable (condestável)
- 11 gunners (bombardeiros)

Total = 127 crew

Plus any soldiers and passengers that might be taken aboard.

=== Compensation and spoils ===
In addition to the cash salaries paid by the Casa da Índia, captains and crew members were allowed to engage in trade on their own account (up to a certain amount). That is, they were authorized to import into Portugal a pre-specified volume of pepper and a certain number of boxes of assorted goods (caixas forras de fretes e direitos, or caixas de liberdades, "liberty chests"). These were to be purchased in India out of their own pockets, of course, but the crown would allow these cargoes to be brought back on crown ships free of freight charge and duties, and sold in Lisbon markets (at pre-set prices), for their own personal profit. Liberty chests had standard dimensions 4' × 3' × 2.5'

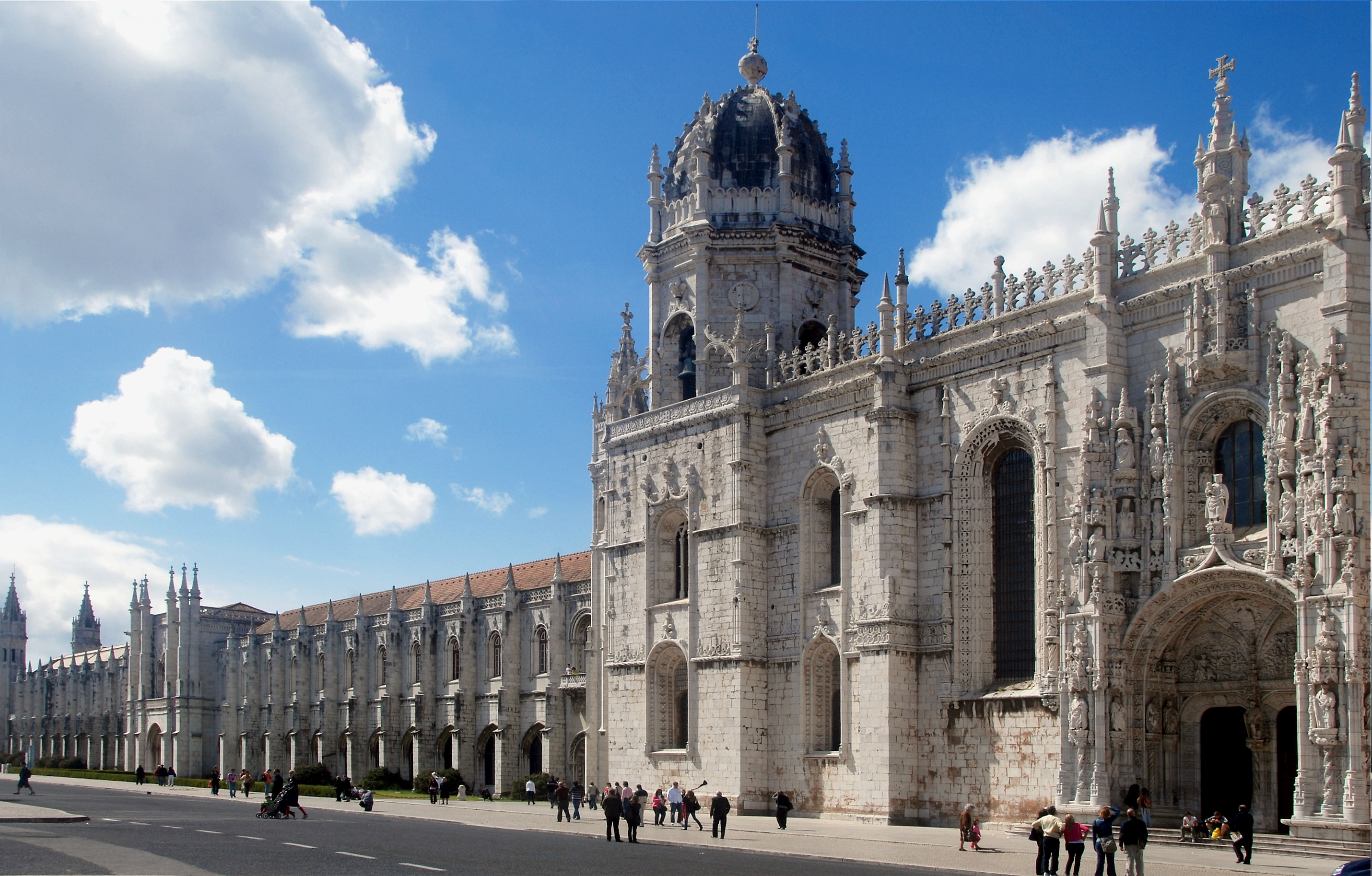
The Jerónimos Monastery, built on the profits of the India armadas

In the early armadas, the captain-major and captains of the carracks were obliged, by King Manuel I of Portugal, to pay the vintena de Belém, a 5% duty of the earnings from the private sales of imported goods for the construction and maintenance of the Jerónimos Monastery in Belém. This rule was introduced in 1502 and continued until about 1522.

The following compensation schedule is taken from the Second India Armada of 1500

- captain-major: 10,000 cruzados for entire journey, 500 quintals of pepper, 10 liberty chests
- captain: 1,000 cruzados for each 100-tonne ship size they command, 50 quintals, 6 chests
- pilot, master: 500 cruzados, 30 quintals, 4 chests
- constable: 200 cruzados, 10 quintals, 2 chests
- gunners: 10 cruzados per month, 10 quintals, 1 chest
- soldiers: 5 cruzados per month, 3 quintals, 1 chest
- sailors: 10 cruzados per month, 10 quintals, 1 chest
- boatswain & boatswain's mate: 1 and a 1/3 times the sailor's salary.
- specialized crew (chaplain, steward, barber-surgeon, carpenter, caulker, windlass-operator): 2/3 of the sailor's salary
- ship-boys: 1/2 of the sailor's salary
- pages: 1/4 of the sailor's salary

The Casa da India allowed the captain-major to draw as much as 5,000 cruzados of his salary in advance, a captain 1,000. Any married crewman could draw up to one year in salary in advance, while a single man could draw up to six months.

Officers, soldiers and officials that were to remain in India in some capacity (patrol ship captains, factors, clerks, magistrates (alcaide-mor), etc.) typically signed employment contracts of three years duration. Soldiers who signed an overseas service contract received a bonus of 800 reais per month en route, bumped up to 1200 per month in India (to pay for living expenses), and the right to ship back an additional 2.5 quintals of pepper per year (in addition to the quintals they were already authorized to send back according to the standard pay scale).

Even if not formally authorized, captains sometimes supplemented their earnings by undertaking a bit of piracy and extortion on the side. Although it did not necessarily encourage India armadas to pursue activities that might endanger their ships and cargoes, rules were still set out for the partition of the spoils of captured ships and extortion of tribute from 'unfriendly' ports.

The rules of plunder were as follows: first of all, the captain-major has the 'right to a jewel', i.e. he is allowed to pick one item from the spoils for himself, provided it is worth no more than 500 cruzados. Then one-fifth is set aside for the crown. The remainder is subsequently divided into three parts: 2/3 for the crown again (albeit to be expended on the armada itself in the form of equipment, supplies and ammunition), and the remaining third distributed among the crew for private taking. The partition of this last third worked out as follows:

- Captain-major: 15 parts
- captains of the large carracks: 10 parts
- Captains of caravels: 6 parts
- Pilot-Master (i.e. those who served double office of pilot & master): 4 parts
- Masters: 3 parts
- Pilots: 3 parts
- Sailors: 2 parts
- Gunners: 2 parts
- Espingardeiros (arquebusiers/musketeers): 2 parts
- Crossbowmen: 2 parts
- Armed sailors: 1.5 parts
- Men-at-arms: 1.5 parts
- Ship boys: 1 part

Once again, the captain-major and captains of large carracks had to contribute 10% of their part to the Jerónimos Monastery of Belém (although that does not seem to apply to the others).

== The India trade ==
=== Cargo ===
While the India armadas were used to ferry troops, officials, missionaries and colonists between Europe and Asia, their primary objective was commercial. They were engaged in the spice trade, importing Asian spices to sell in European markets, especially the five "glorious spices" – pepper, cinnamon, cloves, nutmeg and mace.

The Glorious Spices
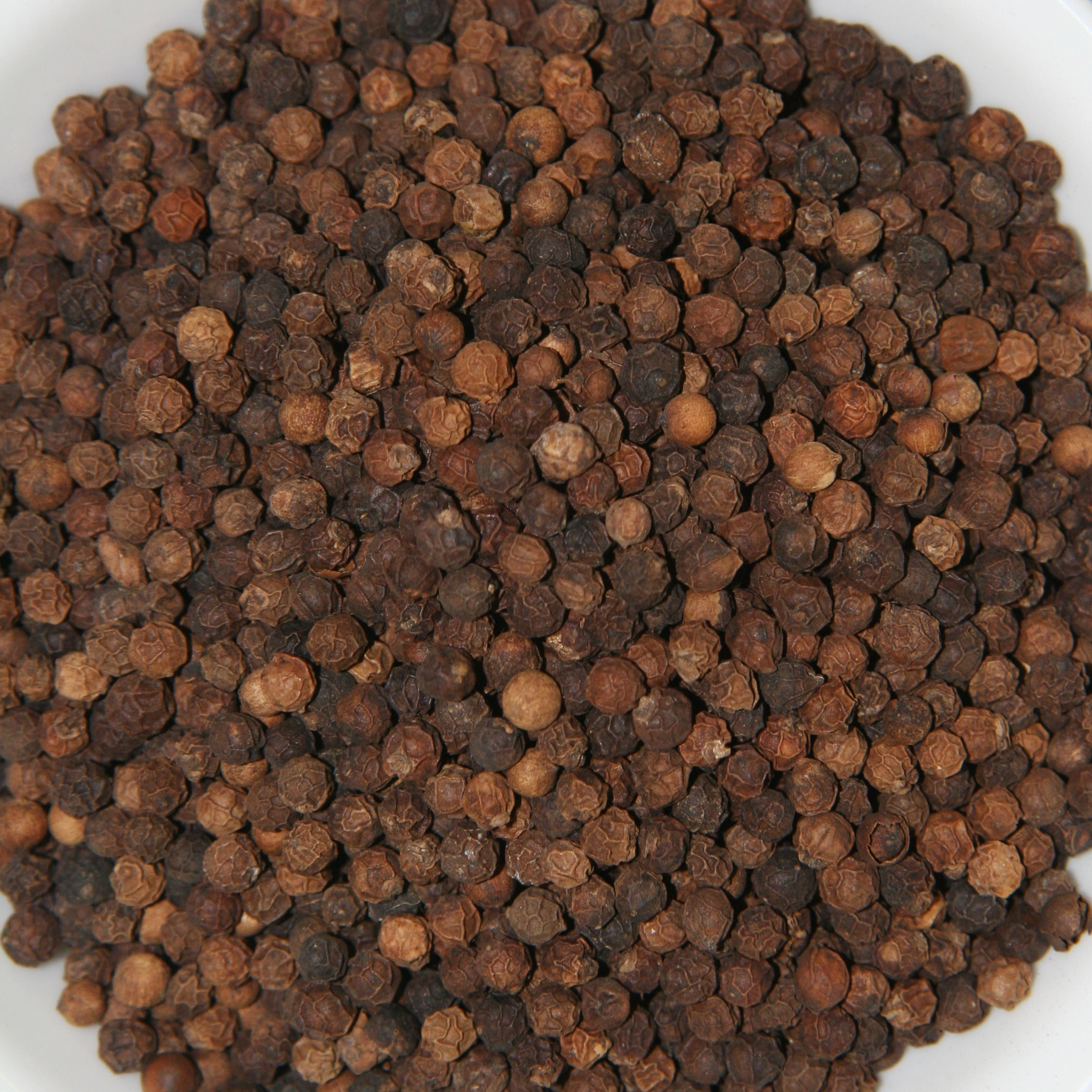
Pepper
(Kerala)

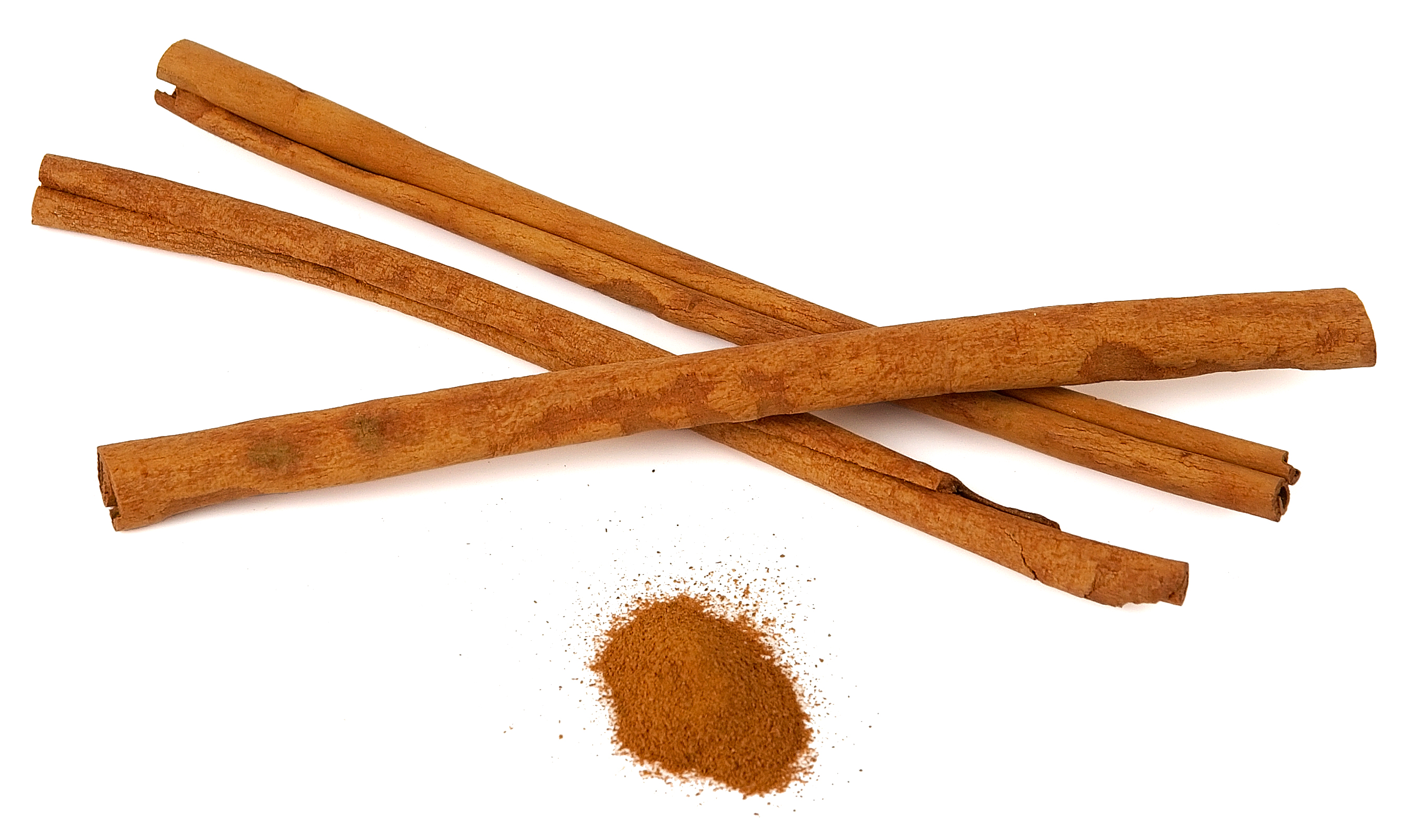
Cinnamon
(Ceylon)

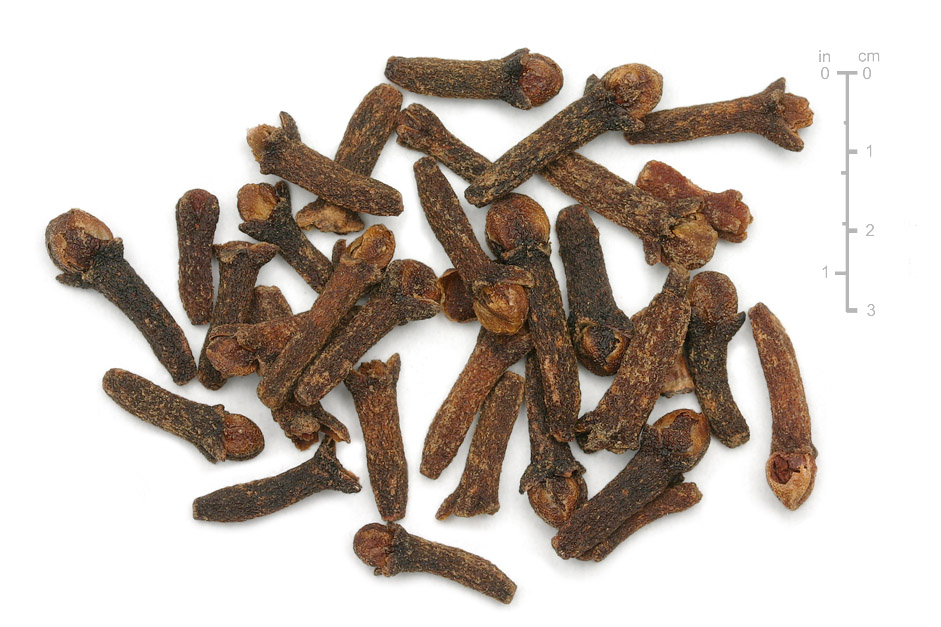
Cloves
(Ternate & Tidore)

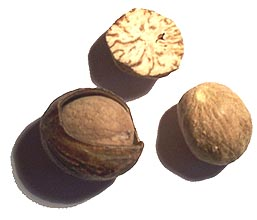
Nutmeg
(Banda Islands)

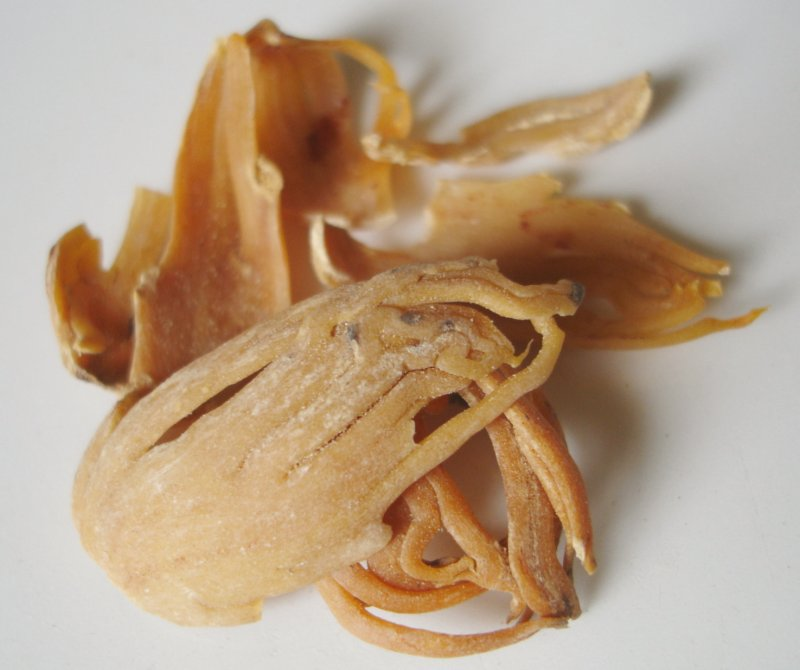
Mace
(Banda Islands)

Black Pepper, grown locally in Kerala, composed as much as 90% of the return cargo of the early armadas. But the other glorious spices could also be found in Calicut, Cochin and other major markets on the Malabar coast of India – cinnamon was imported in large amounts from Ceylon, while, from further east, via Malacca, came long pepper (from Java), cloves (grown exclusively in the Moluccan islands of Ternate and Tidore) and, in smaller amounts, highly valued nutmeg and mace (grown only in the Banda Islands).

The armadas also loaded less glorious spices found in Indian markets, notably locally-grown ginger (the principal 'filler' cargo), cardamom and tamarind, balms and aromatics like Artemisia indica (Indian wormwood), Socotra aloe, galbanum, camphor and myrrh. Also brought back from India were dyes like lac, indigo and dyewood and precious ornamental objects and materials like ivory, ebony and pearls.

It is estimated that the average India carrack brought back between 6,100 and 6,800 quintals of imported spices and goods – or, around 25,000 to 30,000 quintals for the average yearly India armada (4–5 ships). Exceptionally large armadas and/or behemoth ships could push it up to 40,000 in some years. It is estimated that around 15% of the cargo was lost at sea, spoilage, etc. over the long run.

A greater difficulty involved determining the cargo on the outgoing journey. The following list, from the Fourth Armada of 1502, gives an idea of the kind of European items brought by the Portuguese to sell in India: "cut and branch coral, copper in pigs and sheets, quicksilver, vermilion, rugs, Flanders brass basins, coloured cloths, knives, red barret-caps, mirrors and coloured silks." But, by and large, European products did not sell well in Asia, which meant that ship holds were frequently empty, or nearly so, on the outward leg. In other words, outbound ships carried little more than the metal bullion – principally silver, but also copper and lead – needed to purchase spices in Asian markets.

However, if they stopped by Mozambique Island on the outward leg (as almost all India armadas did), they could expect the local Portuguese factors to have a stockpile of East African trade goods – gold, ivory, coral, pearls, acquired during the year at several points along the Swahili Coast – ready to be picked up by the armadas for sale in India.

=== Factories ===
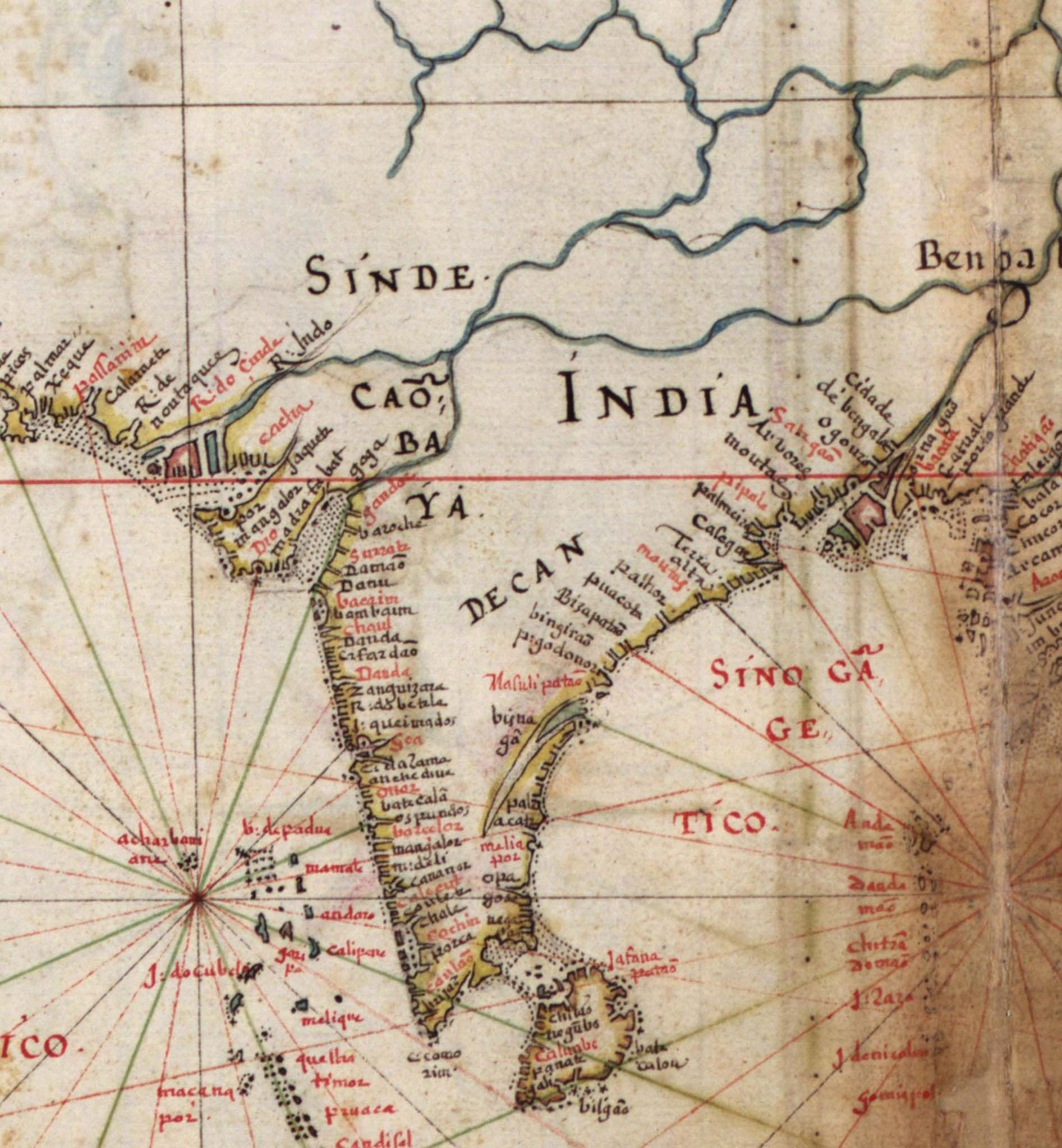
Portuguese map of India, from 1630.

Of course, an armada could not just sail into an Indian city and expect to find enough supplies at hand in the city's spice markets to load up five or ten large ships at once. Should it even try, it would likely provoke an instant scarcity and quickly drive up the prices of spices astronomically.

Instead, the Portuguese relied on the ancient 'factory' system. That is, in every major market, the Portuguese erected a warehouse ('factory', feitoria) and left behind a purchasing agent ('factor', feitor). The factor and his assistants would remain in the city and buy spices from the markets slowly over the course of the year, and deposit them into the warehouse. When the next armada arrived, it would simply load up the accumulated spices from the warehouse and set sail out at once.

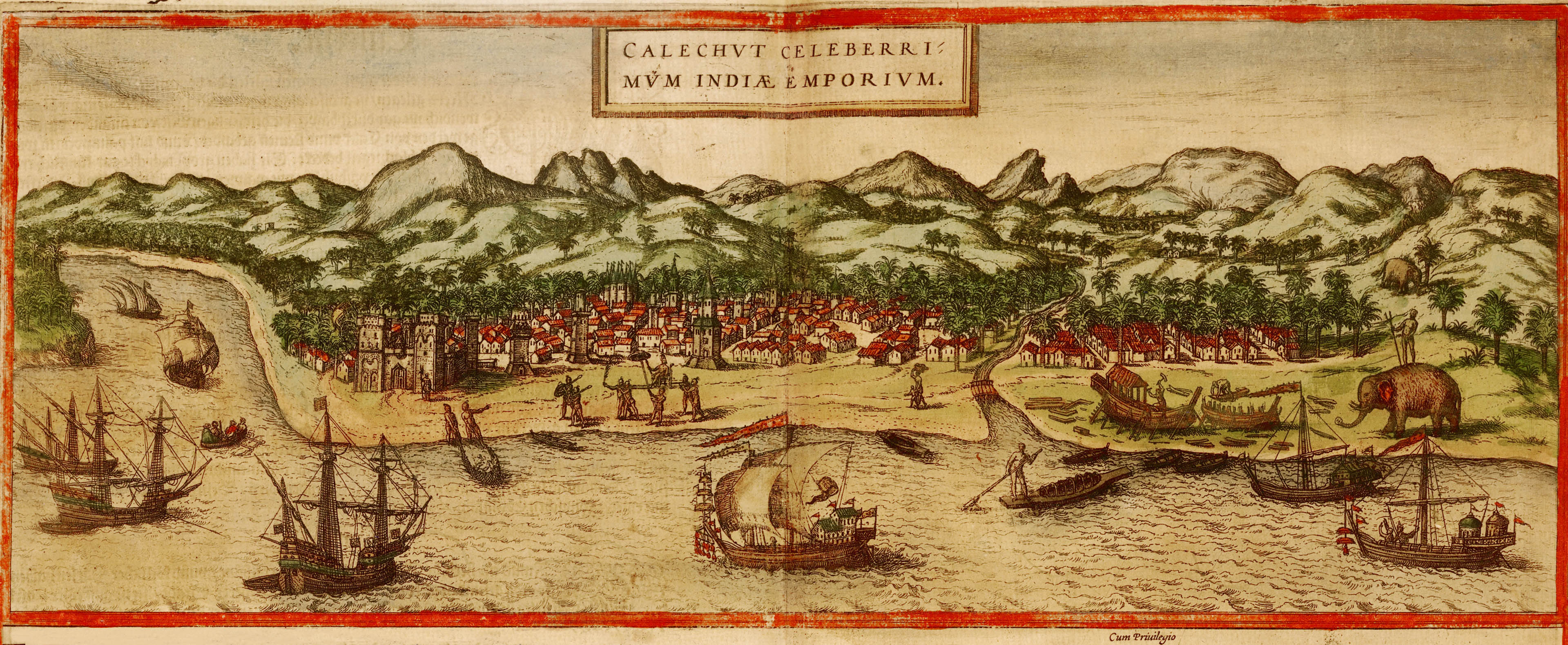
City of Calicut, India, c. 1572 (from Georg Braun and Frans Hogenberg's atlas Civitates orbis terrarum)

The first Portuguese factory in Asia was set up in Calicut (Calecute, Kozhikode), the principal spice entrepot on the Malabar Coast of India in September 1500, but it was overrun in a riot a couple of months later. Consequently, the first lasting factory was set up in the nearby smaller city of Cochin (Cochim, Kochi) in late 1500. This was followed up by factories in Cannanore (Canonor, Kannur) (1502) and Quilon (Coulão, Kollam) (1503).

Although some Portuguese factories were defended by palisades that eventually evolved into Portuguese forts garrisoned by Portuguese troops (e.g. Fort Manuel was erected around the Cochin factory in 1503, Fort Sant' Angelo around the Cannanore factory in 1505), not all did. The two concepts are distinct. Factories were commercial outposts, not political, administrative or military. The factor was formally an employee of the Casa da Índia (the trading house), not an officer of the Estado da Índia (the colonial government).

=== Age of Antwerp ===
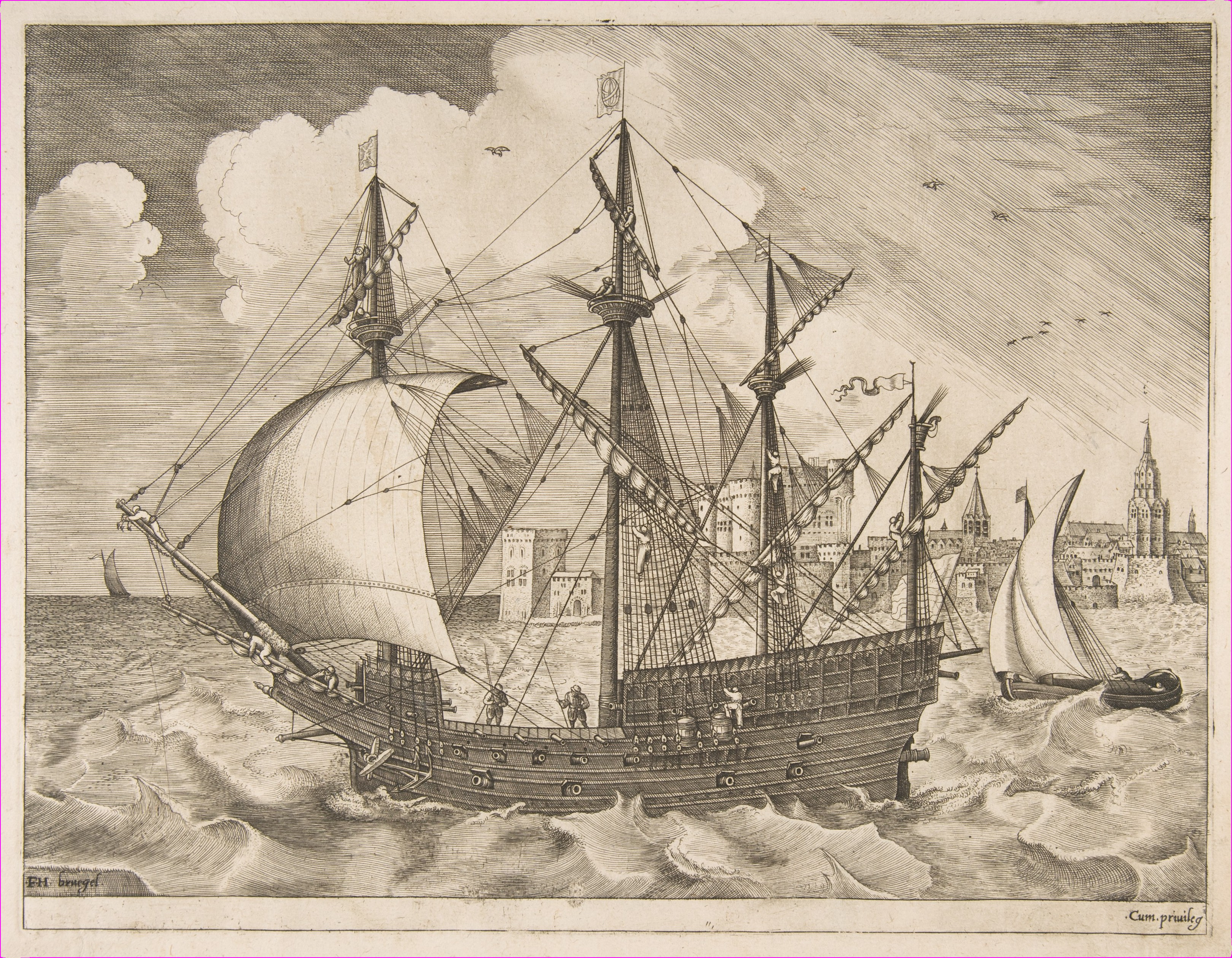
Engraving of a Portuguese carrack, by Frans Huys circa 1555. Identifiable by the armillary sphere it flies as a banner

While Lisbon was the offloading point of the India armada, it was not the endpoint of the Portuguese spice trade. There remained the matter of distribution of the spices in Europe.

Until the Portuguese breakthrough into the Indian Ocean, the supply of eastern spices to European consumers had been largely in the hands of Republic of Venice. Arab and Gujarati merchants ferried spices from Indian ports like Calicut, across the Arabian Sea and into the Red Sea ports like Jeddah. From there, they would be carried overland to ports in the eastern Mediterranean, such as Alexandria, where they would be picked by Venetian merchants and then sold on European markets.

The Portuguese India armadas challenged this old spice route, for a brief period disrupted it, but they did not eliminate it. Despite Portuguese efforts to secure monopolies at the source, enough spices still slipped through the old Venetian-Arab route and forced competition on the sale end in Europe.

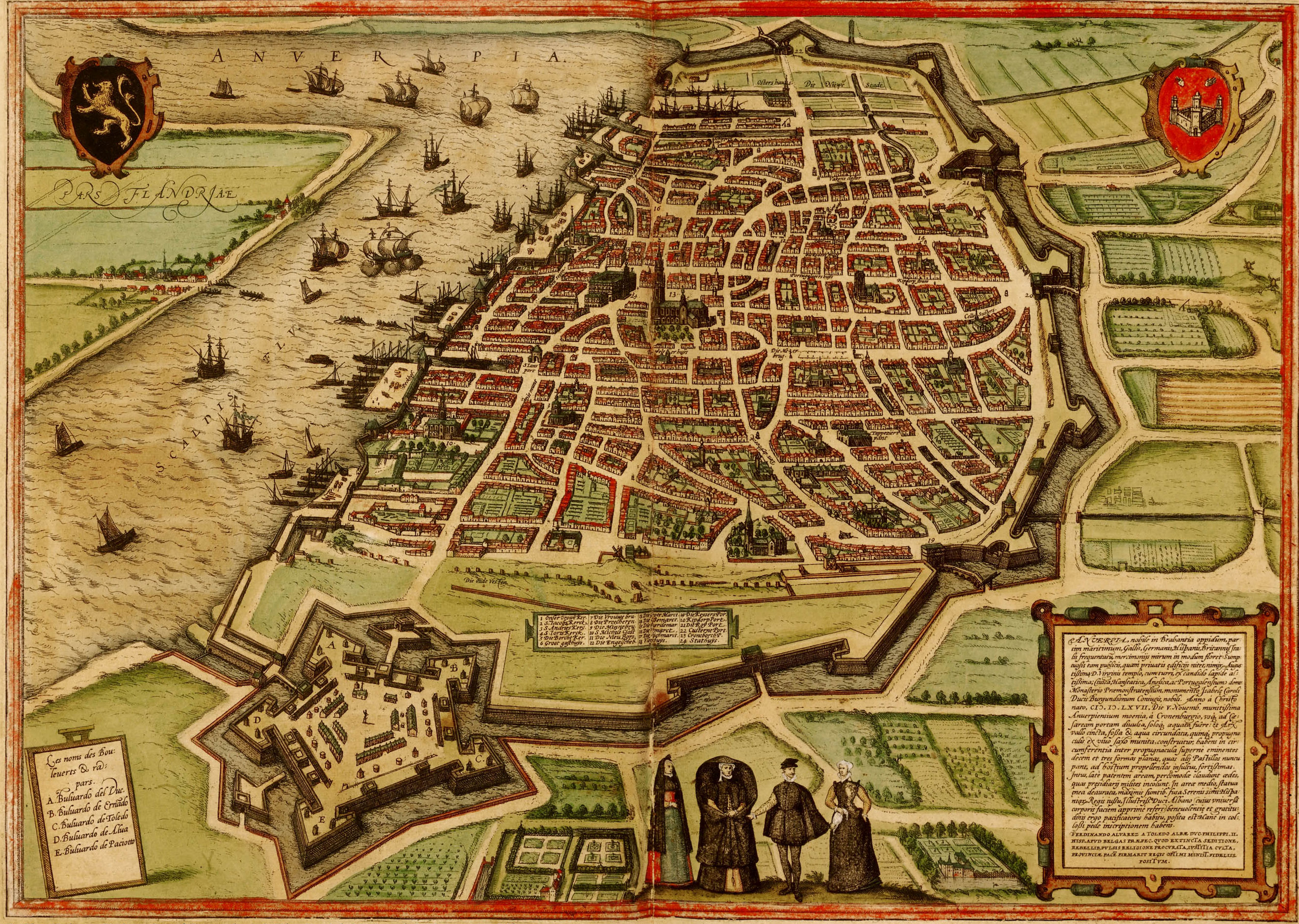
City of Antwerp, 1572 (from Georg Braun and Frans Hogenberg's atlas Civitates orbis terrarum)

Realizing that the Mediterranean was saturated with spices supplied by Venetian merchants, the Portuguese decided to avoid head-to-head competition that might cut into their profits there, and focused on selling their spices in northern Europe, a market the Venetians had barely touched. To this end, the Casa da Índia set up a factory (feitoria de Flandres) in the Brabantine town of Antwerp in 1508. The factory had two purposes: firstly, to serve as a distribution center of the Portuguese spices to the rest of northern Europe; secondly, to acquire the silver bullion needed by the Portuguese India armadas to buy spices in Asia.

It is in the silver trade that Portugal and Venice competed directly. Both needed large volumes of European silver to buy spices in Asia, yet the only significant silver source was in Central Europe, dominated by major German trading families like the Welsers, the Hochstetters and the Fuggers of Augsburg. To get their hands on this silver, the Portuguese and Venetians offered gold, not only from their revenues of spice sales, but also from overseas sources: the Portuguese had access to gold from the Akan fields on the Gold Coast of west Africa, while the Venetians had access to the gold mines of the Sudan (which was freighted down the Nile to Alexandria). Via river routes, the German silver merchants directed silver bullion supplies up to the Portuguese factory in Antwerp, from where ships would carry them to Lisbon, to be loaded onto the India armadas.

The intercontinental streams of spices, gold and silver flowing in and out of the Portuguese factory transformed Antwerp overnight from a sleepy town into arguably the leading commercial and financial center of Europe in the 16th century, a position it would enjoy until its sack by mutinous Spanish soldiers in 1576.

Recent research has shown that, after 1505, most of the trade that moved between Lisbon and Antwerp sidestepped the Portuguese royal "factory of Flanders". Most of the European leg of the trade was directly contracted between the Casa da Índia in Lisbon and private foreign consortiums (usually Italian and German) in Antwerp and freighted largely by Dutch, Hanseatic and Breton ships. As a result, the bulk of the profits of the Portuguese spice trade accrued not to the Portuguese crown, but to the private consortiums (Smith calculates that, in 1517–1519, as much as half the price difference for spices between Indian and European markets was pocketed by private European merchants on this leg; by 1585, the share reaped by the Portuguese crown had fallen to a mere 15%).

== The end ==
Due to a series of costly losses in the 1550s, the Casa da Índia fell into severe financial straits and was basically bankrupt by 1560. In 1570, King Sebastian of Portugal issued a decree revoking the royal monopoly, and opening up trade with India to any private Portuguese merchant. As few took up the offer, the free trade decree was replaced in 1578 by a new system of annual monopolies, whereby the Casa sold the rights of the India trade to a private merchant consortium, guaranteeing them a monopoly for one year. The annual monopoly system was abandoned in 1597, and the royal monopoly resumed. But by that time, everything had changed.

Portugal claimed the Indian Ocean as its mare clausum during the Age of Discovery.

For an entire century, the Portuguese had managed to monopolize the India run. The spice trade itself was not monopolized – through the 16th century, the Republic of Venice had kept up its competition through its overland Levantine routes – but the sea route by the Cape remained exclusively Portuguese. Despite occasional leaks (e.g. the Cantino planisphere of 1502), details of the Portuguese Carreira da Índia had been largely kept secret, or at least was not exploited by competitors. But this changed in the 1590s.

The capture of the Portuguese ship São Filipe by the English privateer Sir Francis Drake in 1587, with its rutter and detailed maps, prompted the first English attempt to sail to the East Indies, a private three-ship fleet organized by London merchants, and led by Sir James Lancaster. It was a disaster – most of the ships and crews were lost, and Lancaster had to resort to piracy to fill his hold – but it opened the way.

In the Netherlands, the preacher and cartographer Petrus Plancius had long been urging his countrymen to set out on their own route, rather than relying on the Portuguese hauls. The Dutch effort received an injection from the information provided by Cornelis de Houtman, a Dutch spy dispatched to Lisbon in 1592 to scout the spice trade, and Jan Huyghen van Linschoten, a Dutch sailor who had served on many Portuguese India armadas from the 1580s. With this information in hand, the Dutch finally made their move in 1595, when a group of Amsterdam merchants formed the Compagnie van Verre and sent out their first expedition, under de Houtman, to the East Indies, aiming for the market port of Bantam. That same year, Linschoten published a little tract in Amsterdam entitled Reysgheschrift vande navigatien der Portugaloysers in Orienten (Travel Account of the Voyages of the Portuguese in the Orient), a rutter giving the details of the sailing directions of the Portuguese India Run. It was republished in 1596, as part of a larger book, the Itinerario, where Linschoten gave the details of the trade and the condition of Portuguese defenses in Asia. It was an explosive sensation. It was immediately translated into English, German, Latin and soon French.

1597 was the bellwether year – the year of Houtman's successful return, and the spread of Linschoten's tracts. A slate of new Dutch companies (voorcompagnie) to trade with the East Indies were immediately erected by various competing merchant consortiums in Amsterdam, Rotterdam, Middelburg and elsewhere – often with the help of exiled Antwerp merchants ('Brabantsche'), who had long been involved on the distribution end of the Portuguese spice trade, but expelled. At least fifteen separate Dutch expeditions to the East Indies, each involving enormous numbers of men, ships, and amounts of treasure, were sent out by the voorcompanies in 1598–1601. From this enthusiastic anarchic beginning, the Dutch trade got organized in 1601, when the Dutch government forced the voorcompagnie to fold under a single monopoly company, the Vereenigde Oost-Indische Compagnie (VOC).

Fearful of being left behind, the English had founded their own East India Company (EIC) in 1600, and managed to organize a small English expedition to Bantam in 1601, but enthusiasm was weaker and the EIC had problems competing with the better-organized and better-financed Dutch.

The vigorous Dutch VOC and English EIC encroachments on the Portuguese Empire and trade in Asia, prompted the monarchy (then in Iberian Union with Spain) to experiment with different arrangements. In 1624, Philip III of Portugal granted a monopoly charter to a Portuguese Companhia do commércio da Índia, a private joint-stock company organized on the same lines as the Dutch and English companies. The Companhia was to take over all the responsibilities of the Casa da Índia, including the annual India armada. It proved to be a fiasco. The Anglo-Dutch breach of the Portuguese East Indies trade was irreparable by this time, squeezing profit margins and rendering the Companhia unprofitable. It was liquidated in 1633, and what remained of the dwindling Portuguese India trade was brought back under the royal Casa da Índia.

== Sources ==
What seems like the first chronology of the Portuguese India armadas can be found in the magnificently illustrated codex known as the Livro de Lisuarte de Abreu ("Book of Lisuarte de Abreu", named after the man who ordered the compilation). It covers the period from Vasco da Gama's first trip (1497–99) to the end of 1563. It is conserved at the Pierpont Morgan Library in New York City (ms. 525).

Another codex of the same nature is the Memória das Armadas que de Portugal passaram à Índia ("Memory of the Armadas that from Portugal passed to India") or Livro das Armadas, held by the Academia das Ciências in Lisbon. It covers the period from 1497 to 1567 (although missing the armada of 1517).

The first Portuguese chronicler to attempt a systematic chronology of the India Armadas seems to have been Diogo do Couto, in his appendix to João de Barros's Décadas da Ásia ("Decades of Asia"), entitled " "De todas as Armadas que os Reys de Portugal mandáram à Índia, até que El-Rey D. Filippe succedeo nestes Reynos", de 1497 a 1581" (Dec X, Pt.1, Bk. 1, c.16).

Other codices include "Relação das Náos e Armadas da India com os Sucessos dellas que se puderam Saber, para Noticia e Instrucção dos Curiozos, e Amantes da Historia da India" ("Relation of the Ships and Armadas of India") (Codex Add. 20902 of the British Library), covering the period from 1497 to 1653. It was compiled on the order of D. António de Ataíde, who was himself responsible for a good part of its extensive marginal annotations. Other annotations were added by later unidentified writers.

One of the more exhaustive chronologies, at least up to 1640, was compiled by Manuel de Faria e Sousa in his Ásia Portugueza (part III, end of volume), published posthumously in 1675. Faria e Sousa includes not only the India Armadas, but all the Portuguese fleets from 1412, including those dispatched to Africa under Prince Henry the Navigator.

There are several chronicles of Portuguese India written by contemporaries and historians, which provide substantive descriptions of the various armadas. João de Barros's Décadas da Ásia and Damião de Góis's royal chronicles (Crónica do Felicíssimo Rei D. Manuel, 1566–67 and Crónica do Principe D. João, 1567) were official chronicles. As a result, while comprehensive, they have the drawbacks of being carefully censored and consciously propagandistic. Both Barros and Gois constructed their accounts primarily from archives in Lisbon although Barros's vast work was far more comprehensive and more conscientiously faithful to accuracy (Góis's was an unabashed hagiography, whereas Barros frequently updated his account on the discovery of any new scrap of information). Barros's work was supplemented later by several additional volumes written by Diogo do Couto, who had spent most of his career in India.

Of the unofficial accounts, Jerónimo Osório's De rebus Emmanuelis, is essentially a Latin restatement of the earlier chronicles, hoping for a wider European audience, and provides little that we don't already know. Fernão Lopes de Castanheda's História do descobrimento e conquista da Índia pelos portugueses ("History of the Discovery and Conquest of the East Indies by the Portuguese", 1554–59), although unofficial, is generally regarded as 'respectable' and reliable. Unlike Barros, Góis or Osório, Castanheda actually visited the East, spending ten years in India, and supplemented the archival material with independent interviews he conducted there and back in Coimbra.

Distinct from all the others is Gaspar Correia's Lendas da Índia ("Legends of India", written c. 1556, manuscript found and published only in 1885). This is almost entirely original material, his facts and names are often at variance with the official chronicles. Correia spent nearly his entire life in India, and drew primarily from materials available there. His style of writing is also much more entertaining, intense and replete with 'gossipy' details. Although not regarded as reliable, Correia's account supplies a lot of information that the others miss or prefer to remain silent on.

Besides these comprehensive chronicles, there are many accounts of particular armadas – on-board diaries, accounts, memoirs and letters written by their passengers.

There is quite some conflict between the various sources over the exact composition of the various India Armadas, particularly in the names of the captains of the vessels. Attempts have been made to reconcile the differences between the sources (e.g. Quintella's Annaes da Marinha Portugueza), although these inevitably involve some degree of conjecture, dispute and revision.

== The Armadas ==
=== 1497 ===
| 1st India Armada (Vasco da Gama) |
| Departed: July 1497; Arrived in India: May 1498 ------------------------- Left India: October 1498; Arrived Portugal: July (Coelho)/Aug (Gama) 1499. ------------------------- Notes: – Travails with Mozambique and Mombassa, – opened relations with Malindi – Opened sea route to India (Calicut) – one ship scuttled on return journey | Fleet: 4 ships (2 naus, 1 caravel, 1 supply ship), 170 men 1. São Gabriel (Vasco da Gama, pilot: Pero de Alenquer); 2. São Rafael (Paulo da Gama, pilot: João de Coimbra) – scuttled on return 3. Berrio (Nicolau Coelho, pilot: Pedro Escobar); 4. Unnamed supply ship (Gonçalo Nunes or Duarte Nunes) |

=== 1500 ===
| 2nd India Armada (Pedro Álvares Cabral) (1st Brazil Armada ) |
| Departed: March 1500; Arrived in India: September 1500 ------------------------- Left India: Jan 1501; Arrived Portugal: June(Coelho)/July (others) 1501. ------------------------- Notes: – 2 ships privately outfitted (9 & 10) – 2 ships designated for Sofala (11 & 12) – 2 ships sent back in Atlantic (9, 13) – Discovers Brazil (Porto Seguro, April 22, 1500) – 4 ships lost at Cape of Good Hope (6, 7, 8, 11) – Dias (12) separated, discovers Madagascar and scouts Gulf of Aden by himself – Est. factory in Calicut, overrun in riot, Cabral bombards city – Est. alliance and factory in Cochin (Gonçalo Gil Barbosa) – Open relations with Cannanore(Paio Rodrigues) was left behind at Cannanore along with Friar Louise do Salvador), Cranganore and Quilon – one ship (2) lost on return – Tovar (on 5) scouts Sofala – Meet 2nd Brazil Armada in Senegal | Fleet 13 ships (10 for India, 2 for Sofala, 1 supply ship), 1500 armed men, 1000 crew 1. Flagship (Pedro Álvares Cabral, admiral); 2. El-Rei (Sancho de Tovar, vice-admiral) – lost on return 3. (Nicolau Coelho); 4. (Simão de Miranda de Azevedo); 5. S. Pedro (Pero de Ataíde); 6. (Aires Gomes da Silva) – lost at Cape; 7. (Simão de Pina) – lost at Cape; 8. (Vasco de Ataíde) – lost at Cape; 9. (Luís Pires) – owned by Count of Portalegre, turned back/lost 10. Anunciada (Nuno Leitão da Cunha) – owned by Marchionni consortium 11. (Bartolomeu Dias) – dest. to Sofala, lost at Cape; 12. (Diogo Dias) – dest. to Sofala, separates at Cape, returns by himself 13. Supply ship (André Gonçalves/Gaspar de Lemos) – turned back at Brazil |

Other 1500 events

- May 1500 Gaspar Corte-Real takes one ship to find Northwest Passage. Goes to Greenland and back.

=== 1501 ===
| 3rd India Armada (João da Nova) |
| Departed: April 1501; Arrived in India: August 1501 ------------------------- Left India: Jan? 1502; Arrived Portugal: September 1502. ------------------------- Notes: – two crown ships (1 & 2), two private ships (3 & 4) – Discovered islands of Ascension, Saint Helena and Juan de Nova – Defeated Calicut fleet off Cannanore (December 31, 1501) | Fleet: 4 ships (+ 1 supply ship?), 350 men 1. Flagship (João da Nova); 2. (Francisco de Novais); 3. (Diogo Barbosa) – owned by D. Álvaro of Braganza; 4.(Fernão Vinet) – owned by Marchionni consortium 5. supply ship (?) |

Other 1501 events

- January 1501. Second trip of Gaspar Corte-Real (with brother Miguel), three ships to find Northwest Passage. Discover Newfoundland, but Gaspar disappears soon after. Miguel returns with two ships to Portugal in October.
- May 10, 1501. 2nd Brazil Expedition. Three caravels sail from Lisbon, led by Gonçalo Coelho as Capitão geral, with Gaspar de Lemos and André Gonçalves possibly under his command, and Amerigo Vespucci on board. Exploratory trip to follow up on 2nd India Armada's discovery of Brazil the previous year. Meet vanguard of returning 2nd Armada at Bezeguiche (Bay of Dakar) in June. Reach Brazilian coast at Cape São Roque in August, discover São Francisco River in October and Bay of All Saints in November. Sailing past Cabral's landing point (Porto Seguro), the fleet discovers Vitória Bay and are said to reach Cape São Tomé by December. Some accounts claim they turned that corner and went on along the cousthern coast to discover Guanabara Bay in January 1502 (ergo Rio de Janeiro), Angra dos Reis (January 6) and the islands of São Sebastião (January 20) and São Vicente (January 22) and what they called Barra do Rio Canonor (in honor of the allied city of Cannanore, India), later corrupted to Cananéia, which they identified as the limit of the Tordesillas line. They are said to have dropped off the famous degredado known later only as the Bacherel ('Bachelor') of Cananeia, and turned back, arriving in Lisbon in sometime between June and September, 1502.

=== 1502 ===
| 4th India Armada (Vasco da Gama) |
| Departed: Feb (Sq. 1 & 2) Apr (Sq. 3), 1502; Arrived in India: September 1502 ------------------------- Left India: December 1502; Arrived Portugal: September 1503. ------------------------- Notes: -d'Atougiua (11) dies, Aguiar transfers from 6 to 11, – Pero de Mendoça takes 6, but runs it aground near Sofala – Est. factory in Mozambique island (Gonçalo Baixo) – new caravel, Pomposa, built at Moz., given to João Serrão as patrol – Gama extorts tribute from Kilwa – Aguiar (on 11) secures treaty in Sofala – three squads meet at Malindi, August 1502, cross together. – Gama reduces Onor and Batecala to tribute – Est. alliance and factory at Cannanore – New factor at Cochin (Diogo Fernandes Correia) – old Cochin factor Gonçalo Gil Barbosa transferred to Cannanore – Gama bombards Calicut again. Indian coastal patrol established, 200 men, 6–7 ships, under V. de Sodré. Composition: i. Vicente de Sodré (on 5) ii. Braz Sodré (on 8) iii. P. A. d'Ataide (on 12?) iv. Antão Vaz (on 10) v. F. Rodrigues Bardaças (on 13) vi. A. Fernandes Roxo (on 14) vii. Pêro Rafael (on 15)?: Both Vicente and Braz Sodré are lost at Kuria Muria (Oman) in March, 1503.; – Pêro Álvaro d'Ataide made new patrol captain. | Fleet: 20 ships in three squadrons (10+5+5), 800–1,800 men Multiple configurations given in different sources. One possible arrangement: Squad 1 (Vasco da Gama); 10 ships (4 large naus + 4 navetas (nta) + 2 caravels (cv)); 1. São Jerónimo (Vasco da Gama); 2. Lionarda (D. Luís Coutinho); 3. São Miguel (Gil Matoso); 4. Batecabello (Gil Fernandes de Sousa); 5. São Rafael (Diogo Fernandes Correia, nta); 6. Santa Elena (Pedro Afonso de Aguiar, nta); 7. Bretoa? (Francisco Mareco/Francisco da Cunha, nta); 8. Vera Cruz? (Rui da Cunha/Rui de Castanheda, nta); 9. Fradeza (João Lopes Perestrello, cv); 10. Salta na Palha? (Antão Vaz do Campo, cv) Squad 2 (Vicente Sodré); 5 ships (2 naus + 3 cvs); 11. Leitoa Nova? (Vicente Sodré/Brás Sodré/Fernan d'Atouguia?); 12. São Paulo (Pêro Álvaro de Ataíde); 13. Santa Marta (João/Fernão Rodrigues Bardaças, cv); 14. Estrella (António Fernandes Roxo, cv); 15. Garrida? (Pêro Rafael?, cv) Squad 3 (Estêvão da Gama) (5 ships (unknown comp.)); 16. (Estevão da Gama); 17. Julia (Lopo Mendes de Vasconcellos); 18. (Thomaz de Carmona/Cremona) – Italian; 19. (Lopo Dias); 20. Rui Mendes de Brito (João da Bonagracia) – Italian |

Other 1502 events

- May 1502 Miguel Corte-Real, elder brother of lost Portuguese explorer Gaspar Corte-Real, heads a new expedition to Canada to find him. Like his luckless brother, Miguel disappears at sea. A third brother, Vasco Anes de Corte Real, petitions to search for his lost brothers, but King Manuel I of Portugal vetoes the expedition.
- 1502 Alberto Cantino, Italian spy working for Ercole d'Este, Duke of Ferrara, bribes an unknown cartographer of the Armazem das Indias, to smuggle out a copy of the Portuguese secret master-map, the Padrão Real. This will the basis of the Cantino planisphere published in 1502. In response, Manuel I of Portugal will pass a new law (November 1504) instituting state censorship of all private map and globe production, with outright prohibition of any depiction of coast beyond West Africa.
- 1502 On return of the 2nd Brazil expedition, King Manuel I of Portugal grants a consortium headed by Fernão de Loronha (or Noronha), a New Christian merchant of Lisbon, a three-year charter for the exclusive commercial exploitation of the 'lands of Santa Cruz' (Brazil). He will drum up a profitable business in brazilwood and novelty pets (monkeys, parrots). It is estimated that Loronha will collect some 20,000 quintals of brazilwood between 1503 and 1506, representing a 400–500% profit rate on the 4,000 ducats the charter cost him.

=== 1503 ===
| 5th India Armada (Afonso de Albuquerque) |
| Departed: Mar (Sq. 1 & 2) Apr (Sq. 3), 1503; Arrived in India: Sq. 2 & Pacheco in Aug 1503; Albuquerque in October 1503; Fernandes in May 1504, Saldanha and Ravasco in September 1504 ------------------------- Left India: February 1504 (Sq 1 & 2); Arrived Portugal: Sq. 1 arrive July 1504, Sq. 2 lost at sea ------------------------- Notes for Sq. 1 & Sq. 2 – two ships lost at Cape (3 & 6). – Sq. 2 makes junction with coastal patrol at Anjediva, – Sq. 2 rescue Cochin from attack by Calicut. – Erection of Fort Manuel of Cochin (Duarte Pacheco Pereira, 150 men, 2 caravels) – Est. factory in Quilon (António de Sá) – Sq. 2 (F. Albuquerque and N. Coelho) lost on return journey Notes for Sq. 3 : – hopelessly lost and split, lose monsoon to India, cross only in 1504. In meantime: – Saldanha (7) discovers Table Bay, extracts tribute from Zanzibar – Ravasco (8) extracts tribute from Barawa and Mombassa – Fernandes (9) roams up to Gulf of Aden, discovers Socotra island. – Fernandes (9) crosses to India, arrives in middle of Battle of Cochin (May 1504) – Saldanha and Ravasco picked up by Albergaria fleet (6th Armada) in September 1504. | Fleet: 9 ships in three squadrons (3+3+3); Multiple configurations given in different sources. One possible arrangement: Squad 1 (Afonso de Albuquerque); 1. Sant' Iago (Afonso de Albuquerque); 2. Espirito Santo (Duarte Pacheco Pereira) – 350t nau 3. São Cristóvão/Catharina Dias (Fernão Martins de Almada) – lost at Cape Squad 2 (Francisco de Albuquerque); 4. (Francisco de Albuquerque) – lost on return 5. Faial (Nicolau Coelho) – lost on return 6. (Pedro Vaz da Veiga) – lost at Cape Squad 3 (António de Saldanha); 7. (António de Saldanha). 8.(Rui Lourenço Ravasco); 9. (Diogo Fernandes Pereira) |

Other 1503 events

- March–September 1503 Zamorin of Calicut lays first siege to Portuguese-allied Cochin.
- Spring 1503 Indian coastal patrol, under Vicente Sodré, strays to the southern coasts of Arabia, where it will remain stuck by tempests and contrary winds until the end of the summer.
- May–June 1503 3rd Brazil Expedition, financed by Loronha's consortium, 6 ships led by captain Gonçalo Coelho, and once again accompanied by Amerigo Vespucci. Discover archipelago they call São João da Quaresma (now called Fernando de Noronha islands) off the northern coast of Brazil in July. Set up first Portuguese factory in Brazil there, as a warehouse station for brazilwood harvesting on the mainland. It is said three other factories are established on the mainland on this expedition: at Cabo Frio, Guanabara Bay (Feitoria Carioca) and Porto Seguro (Santa Cruz de Cabrália). Coelho and Vespucci quarrel and the fleet is split – Vespucci returning to Lisbon in June 1504, reporting that Coelho had died. But Coelho was very much alive, and will return around a year or so later. Until 1506 Loronha consortium will dispatch six ships a year to collect brazilwood in the Brazilian factories.
- June 1503 (France) French adventurer Binot Paulmier de Gonneville sails out of Honfleur, Normandy, on his ship l'Espoir, with a few Portuguese sailors, intending to head for the East Indies. But soon loses all sense of direction. Ends up in Santa Catarina (southern Brazil) around January 1504, fully convinced he had doubled the Cape and reached some Indian Ocean island. He will have a harrowing journey back home, reaching France only in 1505. His exploit will be ignored and forgotten.

=== 1504 ===
| 6th India Armada (Lopo Soares de Albergaria) |
| Departed: April 1504; Arrived in India: September 1504 ------------------------- Left India: January 1505; Arrived Portugal: June/July 1505 ------------------------- Notes: – one ship (5) lost at Cape. – finds and incorporates ships of Saldanha and Ravasco (3rd Sq of 5th Armada) at Angediva (September 4); – Bombards Calicut for 48 hours, razes Cranganore – Destroys Arab merchant fleet near Calicut. – Barreto stays in command of coastal patrol. – Mendonça ship (2) lost in channel on return (rescue mission mounted in late 1505) | Fleet: 13 ships (9 large naus + 4 small ships (navetas/caravels, denoted 'nta' were known); Different in different sources. One possible arrangement: 1. (Lopo Soares de Albergaria); 2. (Pêro de Mendonça/Mascarenhas) – lost on return 3. (Leonel Coutinho).; 4. (Tristão da Silva); 5. (Lopo Mendes de Vasconcellos/Lopo Martins) – lost at Cape; 6. (Lopo de Abreu da Ilha); 7. (Pedro Afonso de Aguiar); 8. (Filipe de Castro); 9. (Vasco da Silveira/Silva); 10. (Manuel Telles Barreto); 11. (Afonso Lopes da Costa, nta); 12. (Vasco de Carvalho, nta); 13. (Pêro Dinis de Setúbal/Dias, nta) – omitted in some lists. See note below. |

Note: In some lists, Pêro Dinis (or Dias) de Setúbal is substituted with two small ships, one under Simão de Alcáçova, another under Cristóvão de Távora, bringing the total to fourteen. To get thirteen again, they assume Albergaria doesn't have his own ship, but is aboard Pêro de Mendonça's ship on outbound journey.

Other 1504 events

- 1504 King Manuel I of Portugal grants Brazilian charter-holder Fernão de Loronha the first Brazilian capitaincy (capitania do mar), with hereditary jurisdiction over the São João da Quaresma archipelago (Fernando de Noronha islands)
- March, 1504 Zamorin of Calicut launches second siege of Portuguese-allied Cochin. Duarte Pacheco Pereira holds off the assault until it breaks up in July.

=== 1506–1511 ===
- 1506 – 8th Portuguese India Armada (Cunha)
- 1507 – 9th Portuguese India Armada (Mello)
- 1508 – 10th Portuguese India Armada (Aguiar)
- 1509 – 11th Portuguese India Armada (Coutinho)
- 1510 – 12th Portuguese India Armada (Mendes)
- 1511 – 13th Portuguese India Armada (Noronha)

== See also ==
- História trágico-marítima – Portuguese ship disaster chronicle
- Portuguese discoveries
- Portuguese East India Company
- Portuguese India
- Spice trade
- Casa da India

== Sources ==
=== Chronicles ===
- Afonso de Albuquerque (1557), Commentarios Dafonso Dalboquerque, capitam geral & gouernador da India [1774 Port. ed. trans. 1875–1884 by Walter de Gray Birch, as The Commentaries of the great Afonso Dalboquerque, second viceroy of India, 4 volumes, London: Hakluyt Society]
- Duarte Barbosa (c. 1518) O Livro de Duarte Barbosa [Trans. by M.L. Dames, 1918–1921, An Account Of The Countries Bordering On The Indian Ocean And Their Inhabitants, 2 vols., 2005 reprint, New Delhi: Asian Education Services.]
- João de Barros (1552–59) Décadas da Ásia: Dos feitos, que os Portuguezes fizeram no descubrimento, e conquista, dos mares, e terras do Oriente.. Vol. 1 (Dec I, Lib. 1–5), Vol. 2 (Dec I, Lib. 6–10), Vol. 3 (Dec II, Lib. 1–5), Vol. 4 (Dec II, Lib. 6–10)
- Diogo do Couto "De todas as Armadas que os Reys de Portugal mandáram à Índia, até que El-Rey D. Filippe succedeo nestes Reynos", de 1497 a 1581", in J. de Barros and D. de Couto, Décadas da Ásia Dec X, Pt. 1, Bk. 1, c. 16
- Luís Vaz de Camões (1572) Os Lusíadas. [Eng. trans. by W.J. Mickle, 1776, as The Lusiad, or the discovery of India, an epic poem. trans. by R.F. Burton, 1880, as The Lusiads; trans. by J.J. Aubertin, 1878–1884, The Lusiads of Camoens]
- Fernão Lopes de Castanheda (1551–1560) História do descobrimento & conquista da Índia pelos portugueses [1833 edition]
- Gaspar Correia (c. 1550s) Lendas da Índia, first pub. 1858–1864, Lisbon: Academia Real de Sciencias Vol 1, Vol. 2, Vol 3 [partially trans. H.E. Stanley, 1869, as The Three Voyages of Vasco de Gama, and his viceroyalty London: Hakluyt Society.]
- Damião de Goes (1566–67) Chrónica do Felicíssimo Rei D. Manuel, da Gloriosa Memoria, Ha qual por mandado do Serenissimo Principe, ho Infante Dom Henrique seu Filho, ho Cardeal de Portugal, do Titulo dos Santos Quatro Coroados, Damiam de Goes collegio & compoz de novo. (As reprinted in 1749, Lisbon: M. Manescal da Costa) online
- João de Lisboa (c. 1519) Livro de Marinharia: tratado da agulha de marear. Roteiros, sondas, e outros conhecimentos relativos á navegação, first pub. 1903, Lisbon: Libanio da Silva. online
- Jerónimo Osório (1586) De rebus Emmanuelis [trans. Port., 1804, Da Vida e Feitos d'El Rei D. Manuel, Lisbon: Impressão Regia.] [trans. English 1752 by J. Gibbs as The History of the Portuguese during the Reign of Emmanuel London: Millar], Vol. 1, Vol. 2
- Duarte Pacheco Pereira (c. 1509) Esmeraldo de Situ Orbis online
- Relação das Náos e Armadas da India com os Sucessos dellas que se puderam Saber, para Noticia e Instrucção dos Curiozos, e Amantes da Historia da India (Codex Add. 20902 of the British Library), [D. António de Ataíde, orig. editor.] Transcribed and reprinted in 1985, by M.H. Maldonado, Biblioteca Geral da Universidade de Coimbra. online
- Álvaro Velho Diário de bordo de Álvaro Velho [trans. 1888 by E.G. Ravenstein as A Journal of the first voyage of Vasco da Gama, 1497–1499. London: Haklyut Society]

=== Secondary ===
- Albuquerque, Luís de (1978) "Escalas da Carreira da Índia", Revista da Universidade de Coimbra, vol. 26, pp. 3–10 offprint
- Bouchon, G. (1985) "Glimpses of the Beginnings of the Carreira da India", in T.R. De Souza, editor, Indo-Portuguese history: old issues, new questions. New Delhi: Concept. pp. 40–55.
- Castro, Filipe Vieira de (2005) The Pepper Wreck: a Portuguese Indiaman at the mouth of the Tagus river. College Station, TX: Texas A & M Press.
- Cipolla, C.M. (1965) Guns, Sails and Empires: Technological innovation and the early phases of European Expansion, 1400–1700. New York: Minerva.
- Gago Coutinho, C.V. (1951–52) A Nautica dos Descobrimentos: os descobrimentos maritimos visitos por um navegador, 2 vols., Lisbon: Agencia Geral do Ultramar.
- Danvers, F.C. (1894) The Portuguese in India, being a history of the rise and decline of their eastern empire. 2 vols, London: Allen.
- Diffie, Bailey W., and George D. Winius (1977) Foundations of the Portuguese empire, 1415–1580 Minneapolis, MN: University of Minnesota Press
- Disney, A.R. (1977) "The First Portuguese India Company, 1628–33", Economic History Review, Vol. 30 (2), pp. 242–258.
- Findlay, A.G. (1866) A Directory for the Navigation of the Indian Ocean: with descriptions of its coasts, islands, etc., from the Cape of Good Hope to the Strait of Sunda and western Australia, including also the Red Sea and the Persian Gulf; the winds, monsoons, and currents, and the passages from Europe to its various ports. London: Laurie.
- Fonseca, Faustino da (1908) A Descoberta to Brasil. 2nd.ed., Lisbon: Carvalho.
- Godinho, Vitorino Magalhães (1963) Os Descobrimentos e a economia mundial. Second (1984) edition, four volumes. Lisbon: Editorial Presença.
- Guinote, P.J.A. (1999) "Ascensão e Declínio da Carreira da Índia", Vasco da Gama e a Índia, Lisboa: Fundação Calouste Gulbenkian, 1999, vol. II, pp. 7–39. Retrieved from the internet 2003
- Hornsborough, J. (1852) The India directory, or, Directions for sailing to and from the East Indies, China, Australia and the interjacent ports of Africa and South America London: Allen.
- Hutter, Lucy Maffei (2005) Navegação nos séculos XVII e XVIII: rumo: Brasil São Paulo: UNESP.
- Logan, W. (1887) Malabar Manual, 2004 reprint, New Delhi: Asian Education Services.
- Mathew, K.N. (1988) History of the Portuguese Navigation in India. New Delhi: Mittal.
- Nair, K.R. (1902) "The Portuguese in Malabar", Calcutta Review, Vol. 115, pp. 210–251
- Newitt, M.D. (2005) A History of Portuguese Overseas Expansion, 1400–1668. London: Routledge.
- Pedroso, S.J. (1881) Resumo historico ácerca da antiga India Portugueza, acompanhado de algumas reflexões concernentes ao que ainda possuimos na Asia, Oceania, China e Africa; com um appendice. Lisbon: Castro Irmão
- Pereira, M.S. (1979) "Capitães, naus e caravelas da armada de Cabral", Revista da Universidade de Coimbra, Vol. 27, pp. 31–134
- Pimentel, M. (1746) Arte de navegar: em que se ensinam as regras praticas, e os modos de cartear, e de graduar a balestilha por via de numeros, e muitos problemas uteis á navegaçao : e Roteyro das viagens, e costas maritimas de Guiné, Angóla, Brasil, Indias, e Ilhas Occidentaes, e OrientaesFrancisco da Silva Vol. I – Arte de Navegar, Vol II – Roterio, spec. India Oriental.
- Quintella, Ignaco da Costa (1839–40) Annaes da Marinha Portugueza, 2 vols, Lisbon: Academia Real das Sciencias.
- Rodrigues, J.N. and T. Devezas (2009) Portugal: o pioneiro da globalização : a Herança das descobertas. Lisbon: Centro Atlantico
- de Silva, C.R. (1974) "The Portuguese East India Company 1628–1633", Luso-Brazilian Review, Vol. 11 (2), pp. 152–205.
- Smith, S.H. (2008) "'Profits sprout like tropical plants': A fresh look at what went wrong with the Eurasian spice trade, c. 1550–1800", Journal of Global History, Vol. 3, pp. 389–418.
- Sousa Viterbo, Francisco M. de (1897) Trabalhos Náuticos dos Portuguezes nos Seculos XVI e XVII, Lisbon.
- Souza, T.R. de (1977) "Marine Insurance and Indo-Portuguese Trade: An aid to maritime historiography", The Indian Economic and Social History Review, Vol. 14 (3), pp. 377–84
- Subrahmanyam, S. (1997) The Career and Legend of Vasco da Gama. Cambridge, UK: Cambridge University Press.
- Steensgaard, N. (1985) "The Return Cargoes of the Carreira in the 16th and early 17th Century", in T. De Souza, editor, Indo-Portuguese history: old issues, new questions. New Delhi: Concept. pp. 13–31.
- Stephens, H.M. (1897) Albuquerque. Oxford: Clarendon.
- Theal, George McCall (1898–1903) Records of South-eastern Africa collected in various libraries & archive departments in Europe, 9 vols., London: Clowes for Gov of Cape Colony.
- Theal, George McCall (1902) The Beginning of South African History. London: Unwin.
- Vila-Santa, Nuno (2020), The Portuguese India Run (16th-18th centuries): A Bibliography
- Waters, D.W. (1988) "Reflections Upon Some Navigational and Hydrographic Problems of the XVIth Century Related to the voyage of Bartolomeu Dias", Revista da Universidade de Coimbra, Vol. 34, pp. 275–347. offprint
- Whiteway, R.S. (1899) The Rise of Portuguese Power in India, 1497–1550. Westminster: Constable.
