= Portuguese Renaissance =

Cultural and artistic movement in Portugal during 15th and 16th century

The Portuguese Renaissance was the cultural and artistic movement in Portugal during the 15th and 16th centuries. Though the movement coincided with the Spanish and Italian renaissances, the Portuguese Renaissance was largely separate from other European Renaissances and instead was extremely important in opening Europe to the unknown and bringing a more worldly view to those European Renaissances, as at the time the Portuguese Empire spanned the globe.

== Context ==
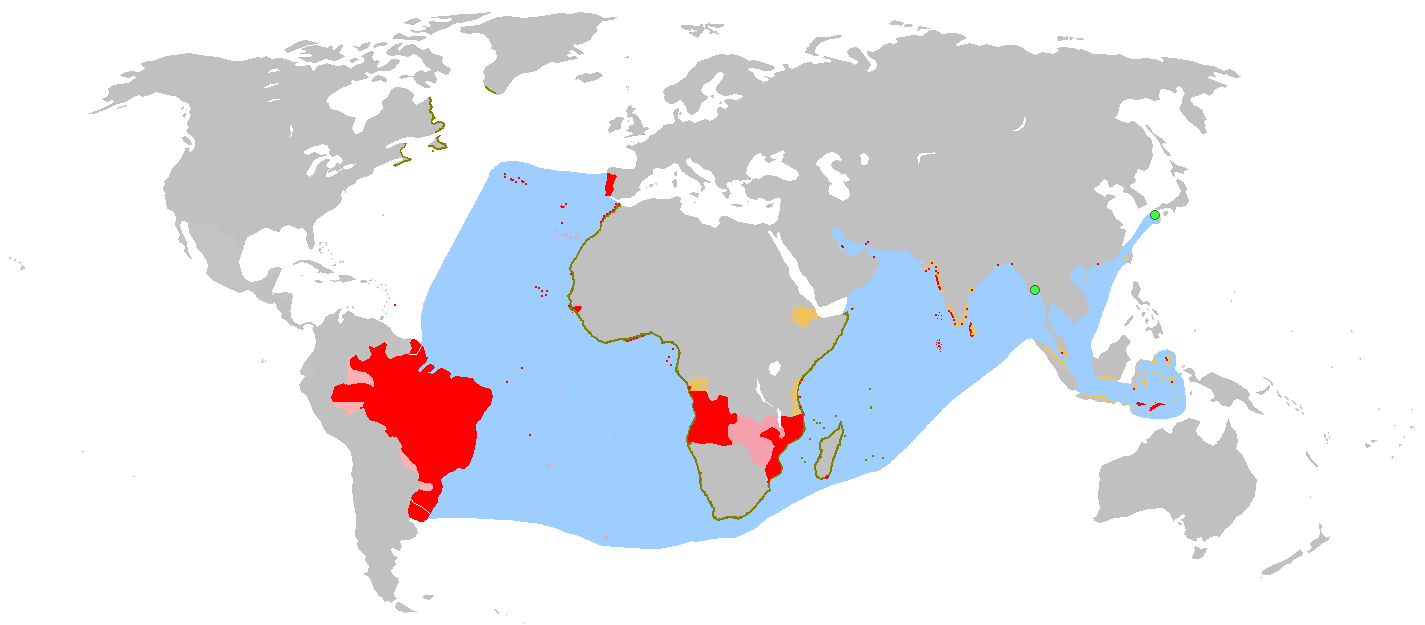
The vastness and diversity of the Portuguese Empire was a key factor behind the Portuguese Renaissance.

Diplomats, merchants, students, humanists, scholars, and artists, from all over Europe, were drawn to Portugal during its Renaissance. The maritime trade of the Age of Discovery played a decisive role in the evolution of the Portuguese Renaissance. Trade intensified contacts with important centres of the Italian Renaissance and it allowed a new commercial bourgeoisie to prosper and have excess funds to become patrons of the arts, much like the other Renaissances of Europe.

The discovery of new worlds and contact with other civilisations led to a cultural mix, which was reflected in the arts and literature of the Portuguese Renaissance. The contact with the civilisations of Africa and the East led to the importation of numerous objects of ceramics, textiles and furniture, precious woods, ivory and silk, in turn, led to the emergence of new artistic forms resulting cultural exchanges between Europe, and East Africa, through the Portuguese. The new trade of items with the newly discovered lands is also what allowed the Portuguese Renaissance to be funded, by creating a wealthy Portuguese nobility and merchant class.

== Arts ==
The arts in the Portuguese Renaissance are a matter of historiographical dispute. This is because despite arts flourishing in this time, they did not follow the classicist aesthetic standards on which the Italians built their Renaissance. The arts of the Portuguese Renaissance were unique amongst other Renaissance arts. They were a mixing of Late Gothic style with the innovations of the fifteenth century and a Portuguese national twist all at once. The assimilation with the Italian Renaissance arts model only really begins around 1540, when Portuguese Renaissance artists started breaking away from their national norms and adapting their works to the classicist Italian and Spanish model, while still possessing a Portuguese flavour.

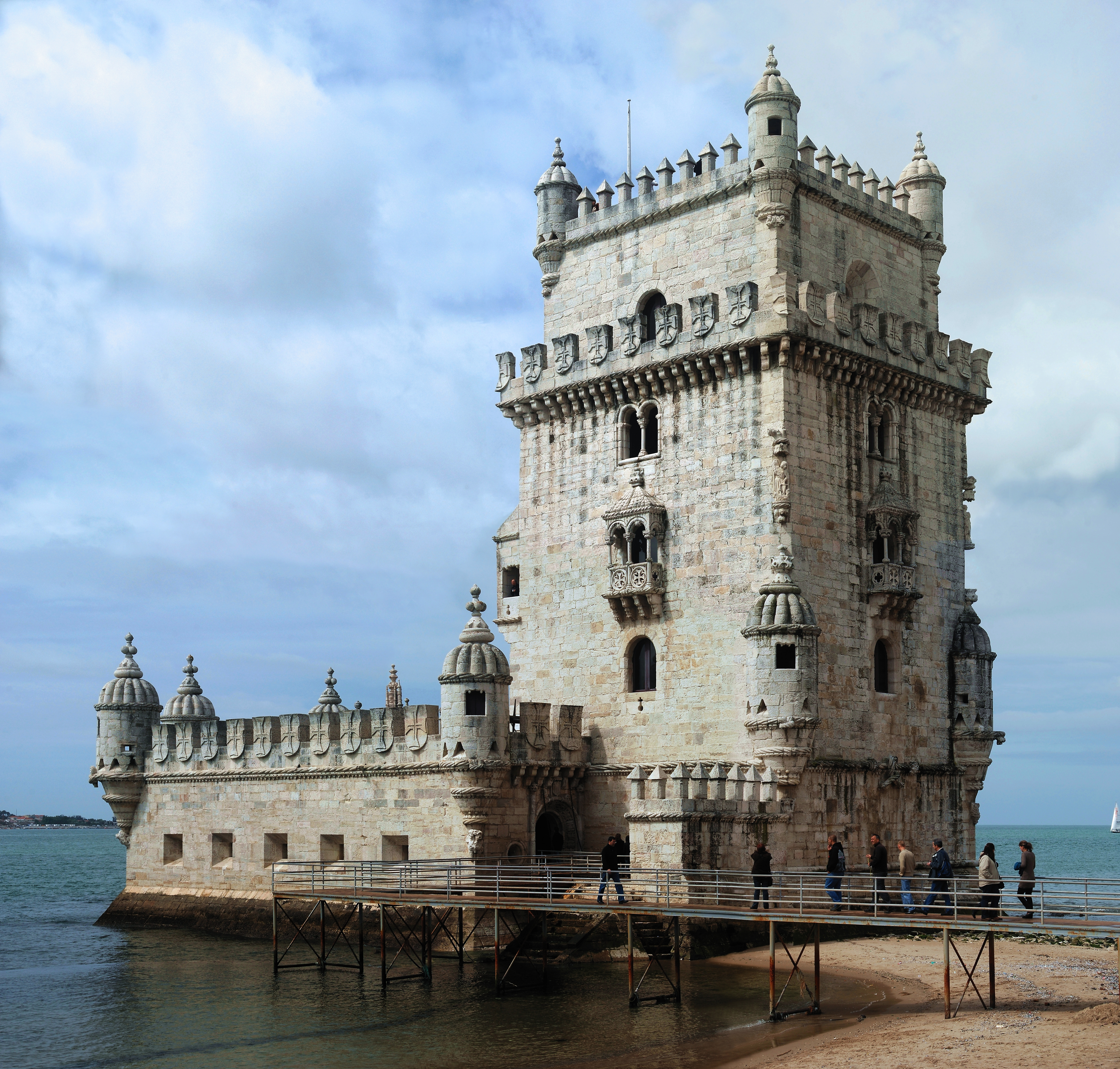
Francisco de Arruda's Belém Tower is one of the most emblematic architectural pieces of the Portuguese Renaissance.

=== Architecture ===
In terms of architecture, much like many sections of the arts, the Portuguese Renaissance did not, initially or mainly, follow the path of the Renaissance elsewhere in Europe. These latter focused on the sophistication and simplicity of the ancient Greeks and Romans. Rather, Portuguese Renaissance in its architecture was largely a continuation and elaboration of the Gothic.

The profits of the spice trade, during the reigns of John II, Manuel I, and John III, financed the sumptuous and dominant style of the Portuguese Renaissance, the Manueline style. The Manueline was largely an intricate and complex style, with heavy gothic and light neo-classical influence, that was unique to Portugal.

The first known building in Manueline style is the Monastery of Jesus of Setubal, by the architect Diogo de Boitaca, one of the originators and masters of the style. The nave of the monastery's church, supported by spiral columns, reveals the attempt to render the balanced nave and aisles of a Hall church. This style reaches its climax in the church of Jerónimos Monastery, completed in 1520 by architect João de Castilho. Francisco de Arruda's Belém Tower and chapter window of the Convent of the Order of Christ, in Tomar, are some of the most famous examples of the Manueline style, and Portuguese Renaissance architecture as a whole.

Austere Renaissance classicism did not flourish much in the Portuguese Renaissance, but slowly established itself from the 1530s and onward, with the help of both foreigners and nationals, like Francisco de Holanda and Diogo de Torralva. The Hermitage of Nossa Senhora da Conceição, in Tomar, by Diogo de Torralva, is an excellent examples of the pure Renaissance classical architecture from the Portuguese Renaissance. Some examples of the strong and pure classical Renaissance are Miguel de Arruda's Igreja da Graça, in Évora, Diogo de Arruda's Ducal Palace of Vila Viçosa, in Vila Viçosa, and the Cloister of King D. John III, at the Convent of the Order of Christ, by Diogo de Torralva and Filippo Terzi, considered one of the most emblematic pieces of the Portuguese Renaissance. The Quinta da Bacalhoa and the Casa dos Bicos are good examples of strong classical Renaissance style palaces, which still hold Manueline tendencies.

The classical side portal of the Old Cathedral of Coimbra, by João de Ruão

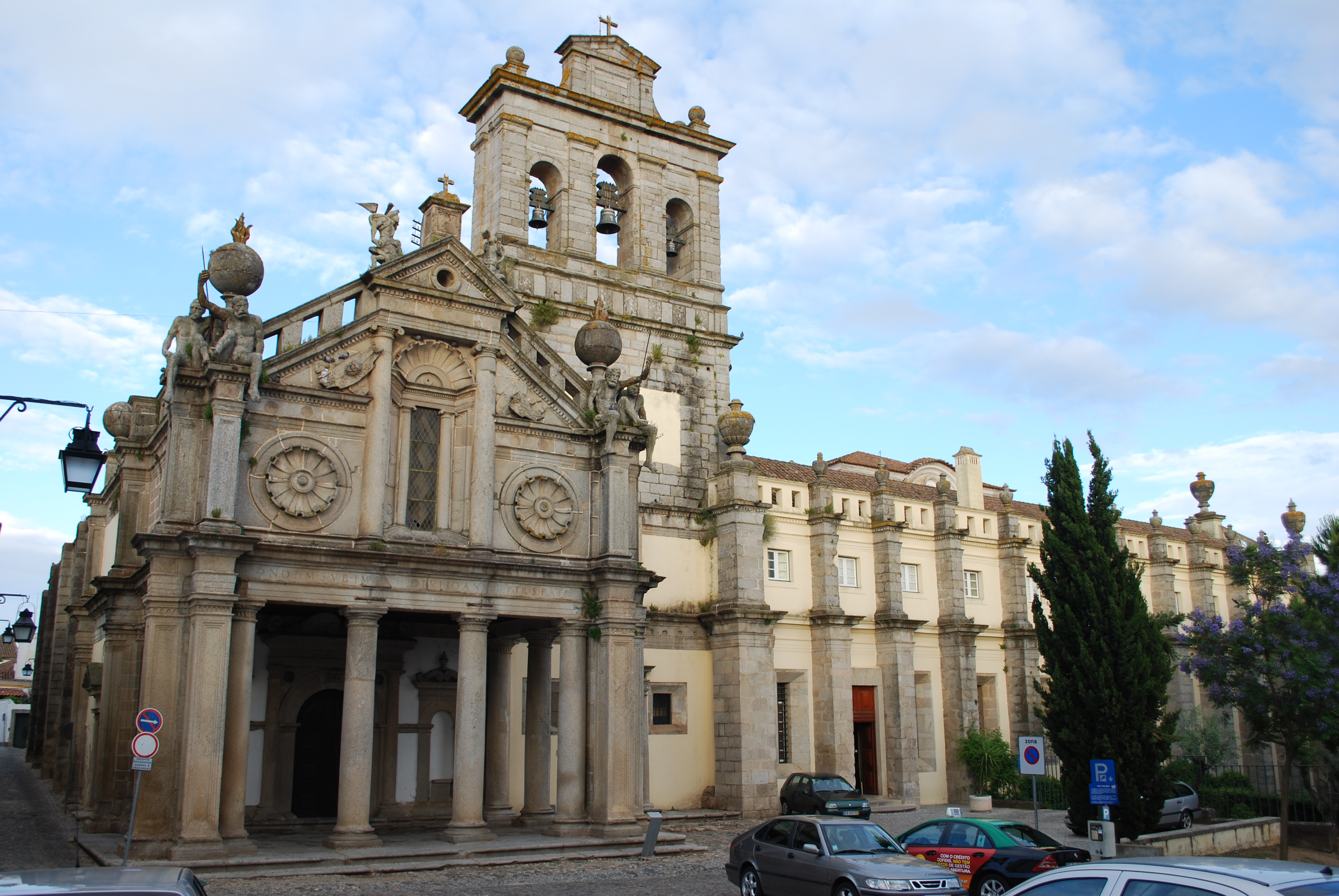
The façade of the Church of Nossa Senhora da Graça, by Miguel de Arruda

The manueline façade of the Monastery of Santa Cruz, by Diogo de Boitaca

The Cloister of John III, at the Convent of Christ, by Diogo de Torralva and Filippo Terzi

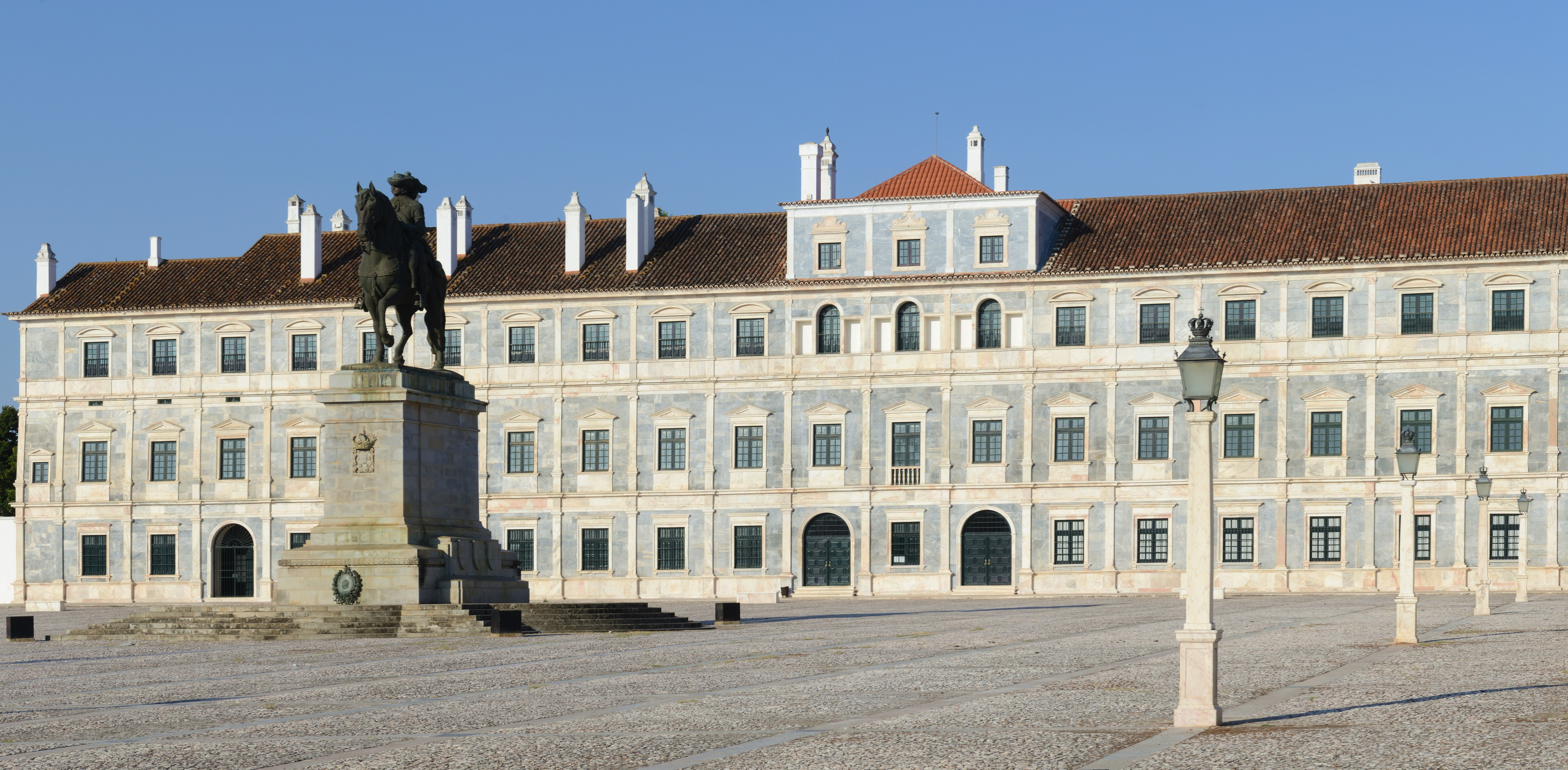
The classical façade of the Ducal Palace of Vila Viçosa, by Diogo de Arruda

The façade of the Church of Nossa Senhora da Conceição Velha, by Francisco Ferreira

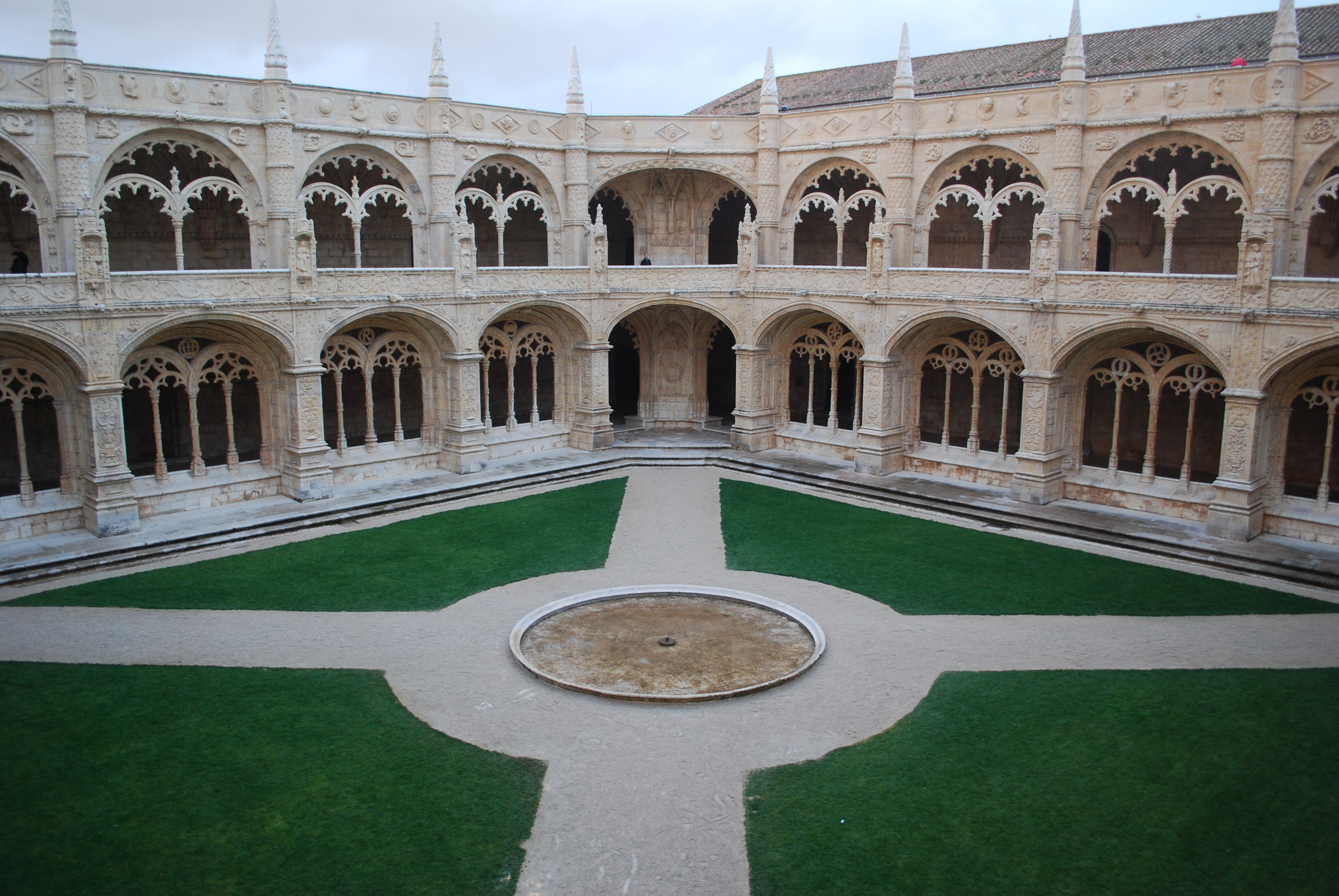
The cloister of Jerónimos Monastery, by Teodósio Frias and Diogo Vaz

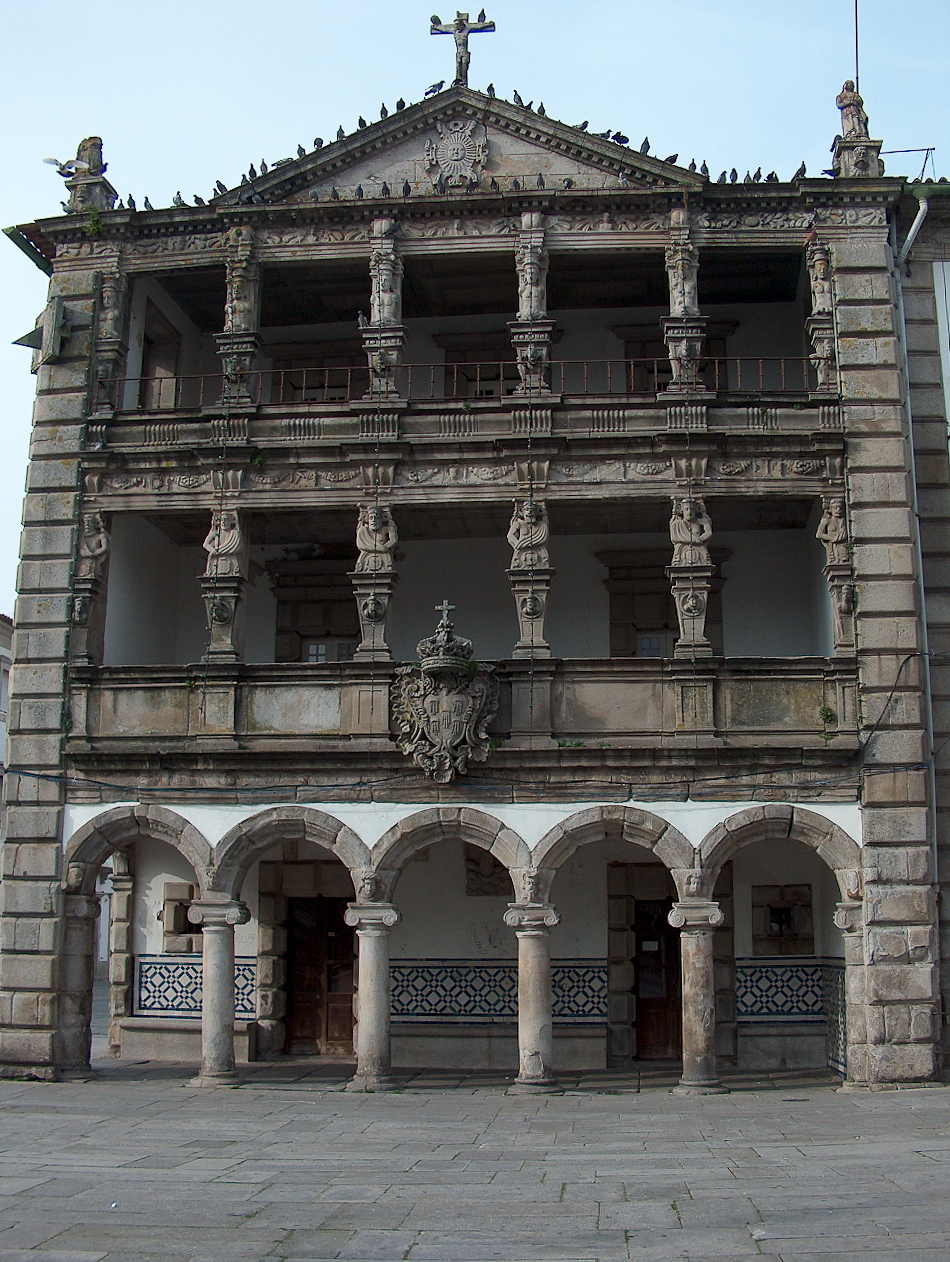
The House of Misericórdia, in Viana do Castelo, by João Lopes

=== Painting ===
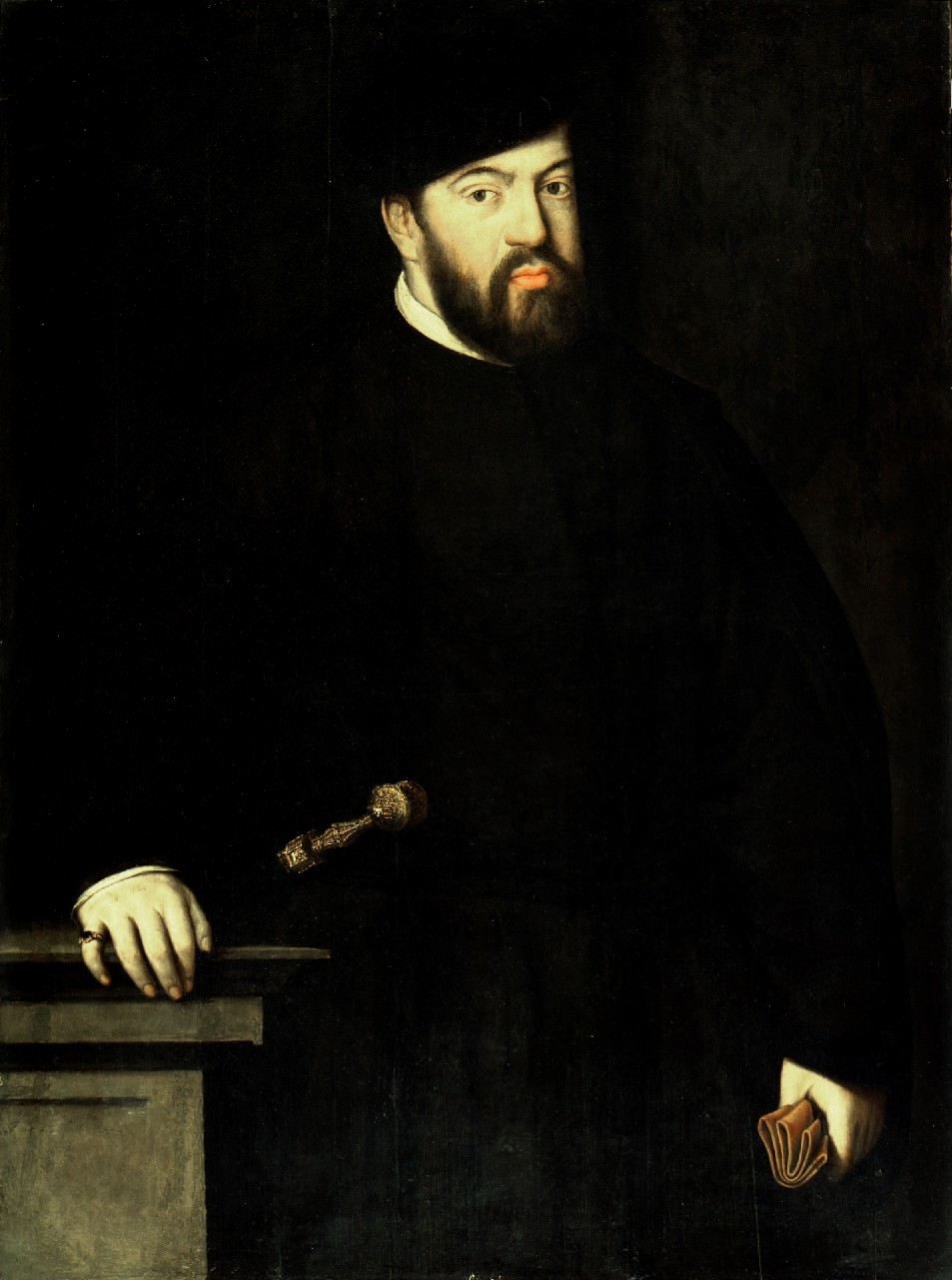
John III's reign, which saw Portuguese monopoly on the spice trade, allowed a flourishing of Portuguese painting.

Painting was one of the more distinguishing factors of the Portuguese Renaissance, being one of the more contrasting arts to the other Renaissances of Europe. Painting in the Portuguese Renaissance was largely sober and almost exclusively religious, being more in line with the Northern Renaissance in nature, not following the pomp and excess of the Italian and Spanish Renaissances.

Portuguese Renaissance painting was largely in contact with Flemish style. Links between the two movements reached a new level, in 1430, with the marriage of Isabel of Aviz, Infanta of Portugal, to Philip III, Duke of Burgundy. While the marriage was in negotiations, the Burgundian court sent the famed Jan van Eyck to paint the Portrait of Isabel of Aviz. Van Eyck remained in Portugal for over a year, where he established a school of art, alongside Olivier de Gand and Jean d'Ypres. This school gave origin to the School of Masters of the Sé Cathedral of Angra do Heroísmo, which was fostered by Jácome de Bruges.

Nuno Gonçalves, author of the Saint Vincent Panels and designer of the Pastrana Tapestries, is considered one of the precursors of Portuguese Renaissance painting. In his panels, considered one of the most important pieces of painted art in Portuguese history, he depicts prominent figures of Portuguese nobility, royalty, and clergy of the time with a dry style but powerfully realistic. His concern of portraying each figure individually, shows heavy Flemish influence, and foreshadows later Renaissance concerns.

At the beginning of the 16th century, various schools of painters were active throughout Portugal and its empire, often in collaboration with foreigners. A common trend amongst these schools was to give credit to their works of art as a school, and leave the actual author anonymous, making it difficult to attribute authorship. Even amongst those painters that gave their name to their works, it is complicated to verify the total validity of authorship due to the habit of collective works. A famous example of this was by court painter Jorge Afonso, whose pieces were often worked on by his colleagues at court, such as Frei Carlos, Francisco Henriques, Cristóvão de Figueiredo, Garcia Fernandes, Gregório Lopes, and Jorge Leal, amongst others. In Northern Portugal, a similar group existed, centered on Vasco Fernandes, alongside Gaspar Vaz and Fernão de Anes.

During the Portuguese Renaissance, the largest center of learning and arts was Lisbon, which thrived as a great city of Europe, because of its privileged position as a major trading center, open to a constant flow of new information, cultures, and finance. Lisbon was a true center of the European Renaissance, where artists and scholars from the corners of Europe came to try to make money. The rich Lisbon nobility funded countless paintings, often for either religious institutions in Lisbon or in their feudal estates. The Portuguese royal court often transferred between Lisbon, Coimbra, a former capital of Portugal, and Évora, which allowed these three cities to establish themselves as the largest centers of the Portuguese Renaissance. In Coimbra, the School of Coimbra was founded by Vicente Gil and his son, Manuel Vicente. In Évora, Manuel I of Portugal established a rich court, which would see its height under his son, Cardinal Infante Henrique of Aviz, Archbishop of Évora, who founded the University of Évora and its school of arts.

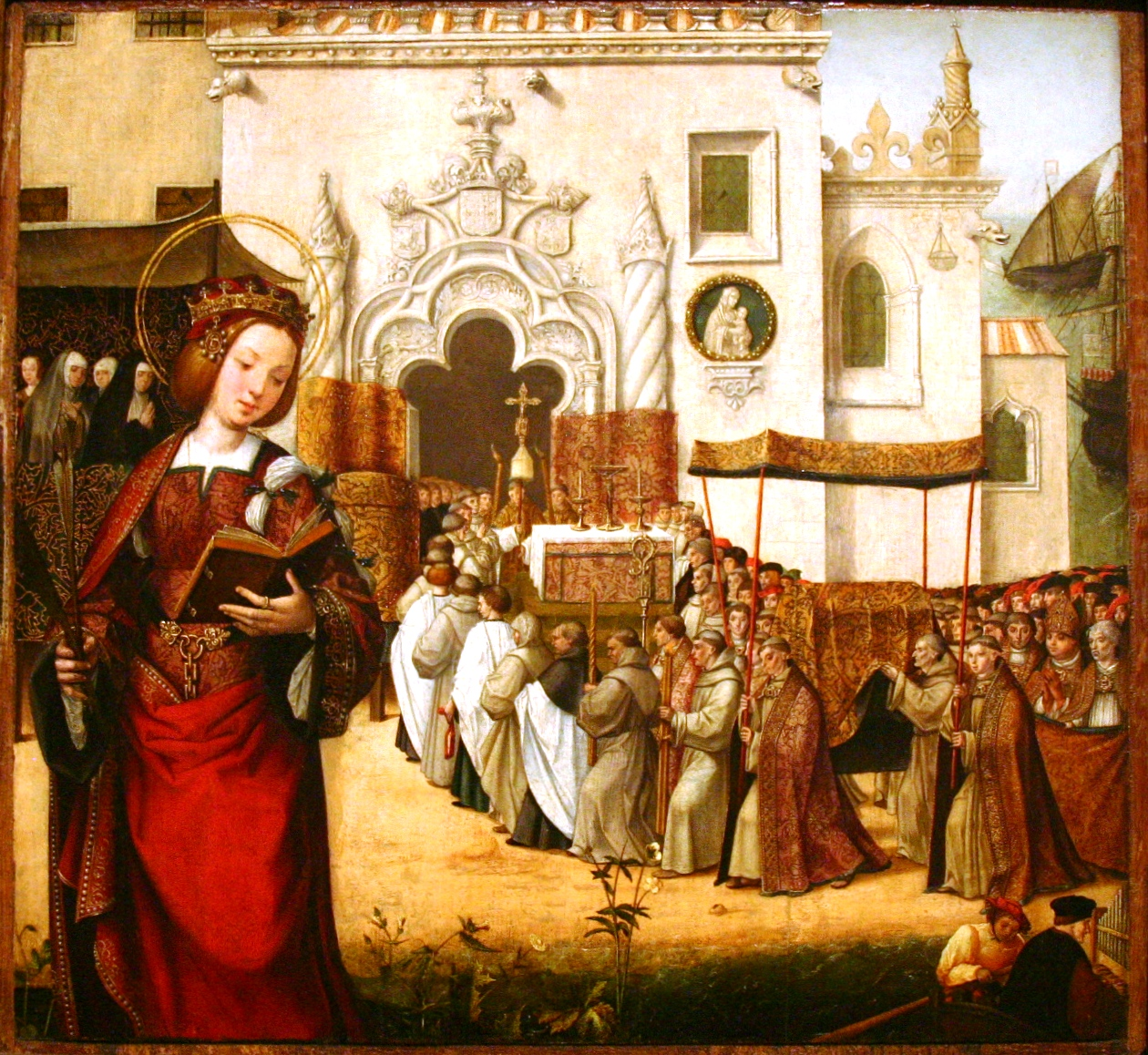
Arrival of the Relics at Madre de Deus, by Cristóvão de Figueiredo and Garcia Fernandes

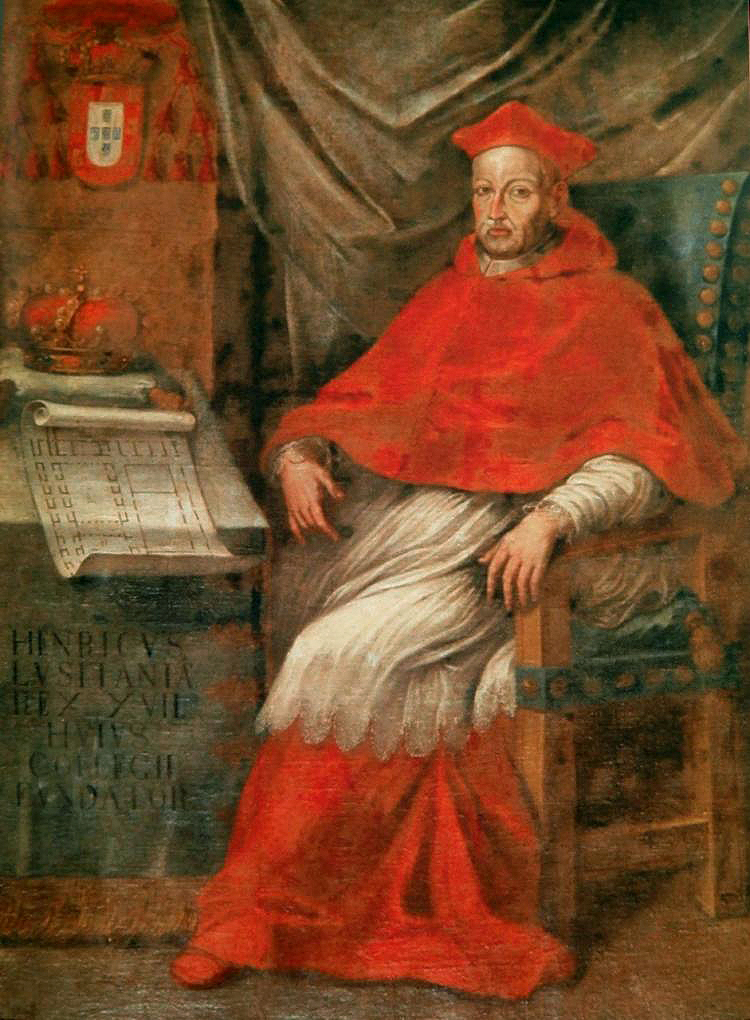
Portrait of King Cardenal Henrique I of Portugal, by the School of Évora

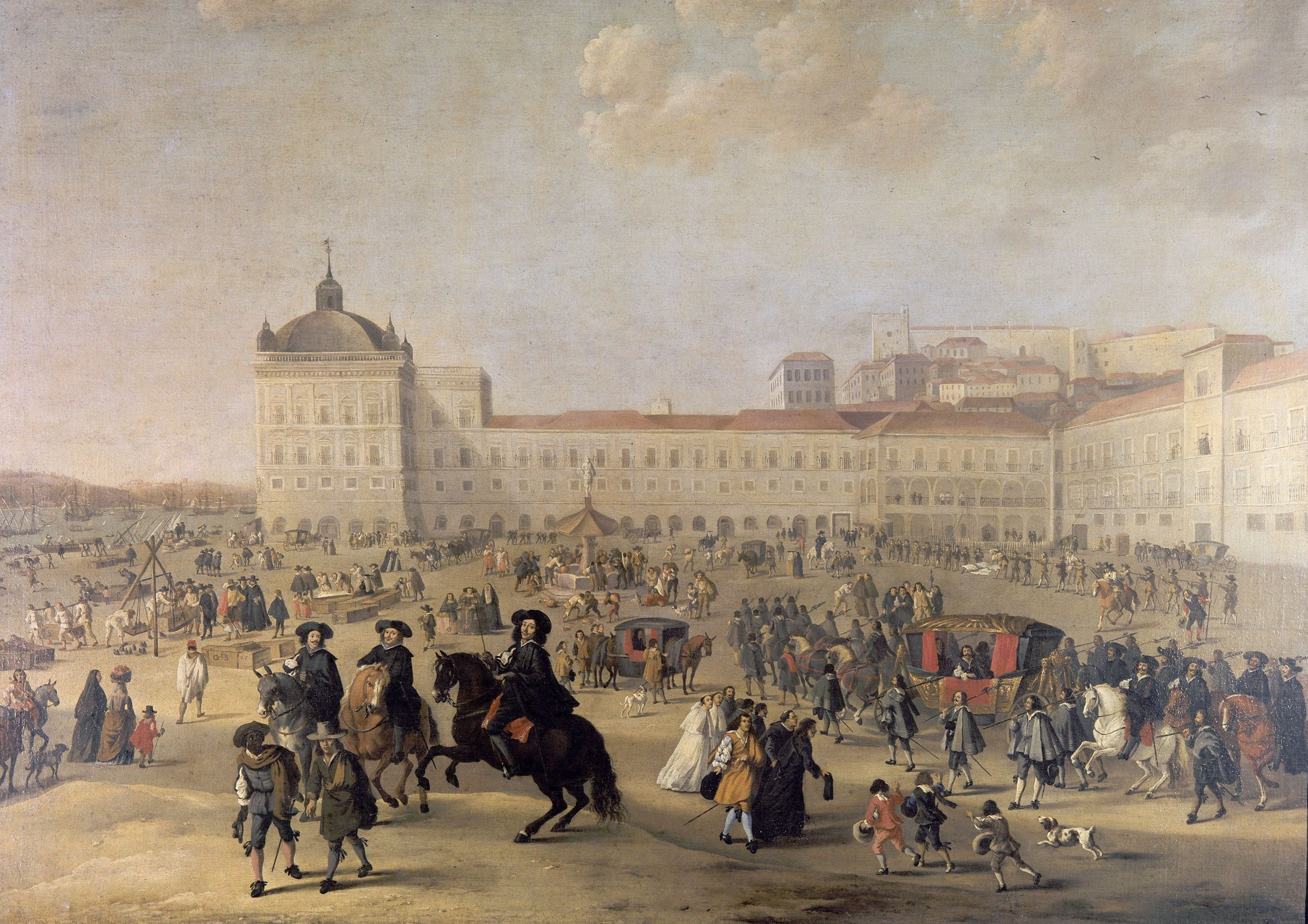
Ribeira Palace and the Terreiro do Paço, by Rodrigo Stoop

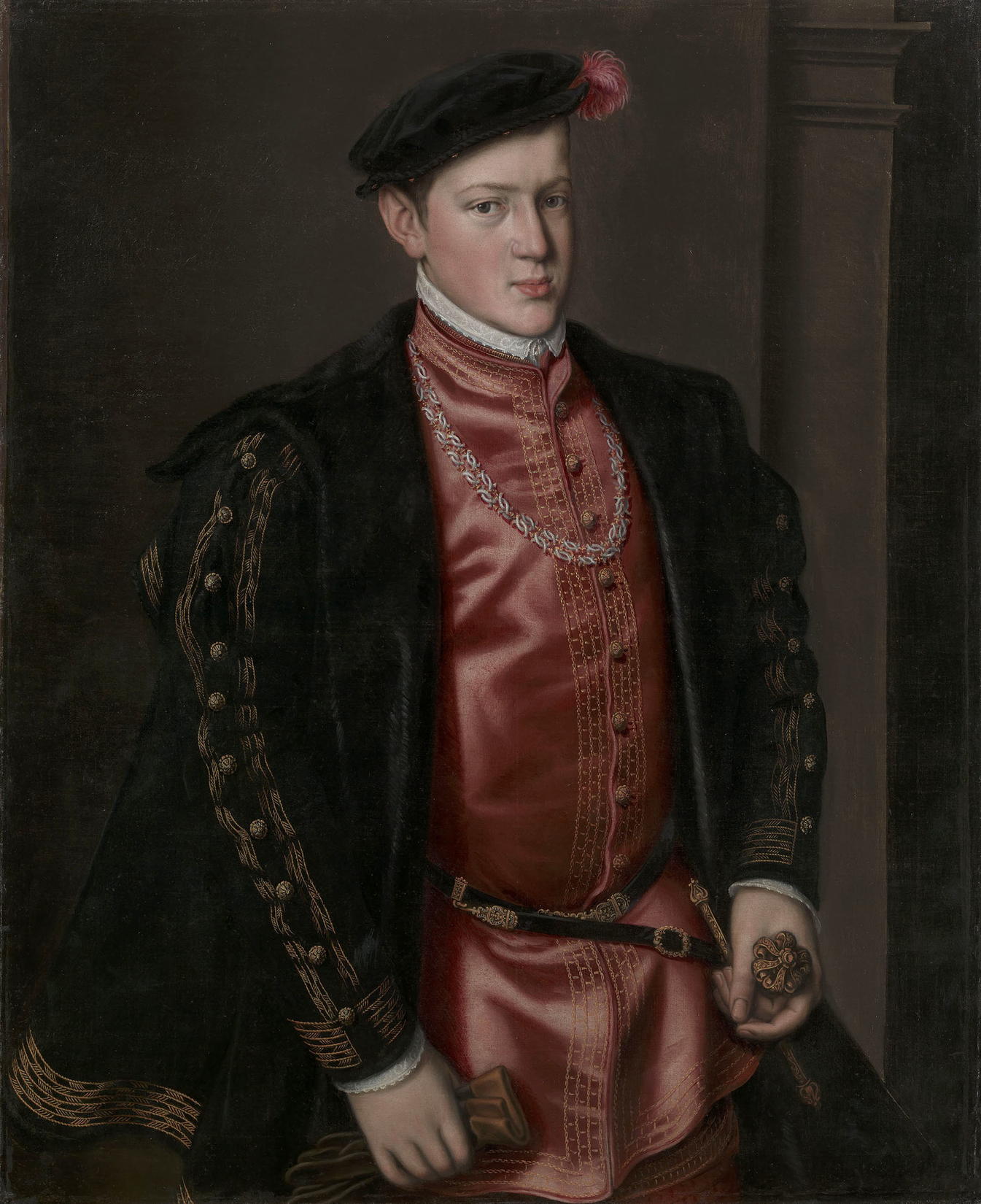
Portrait of João Manuel, Prince of Portugal, by Antonio Moro

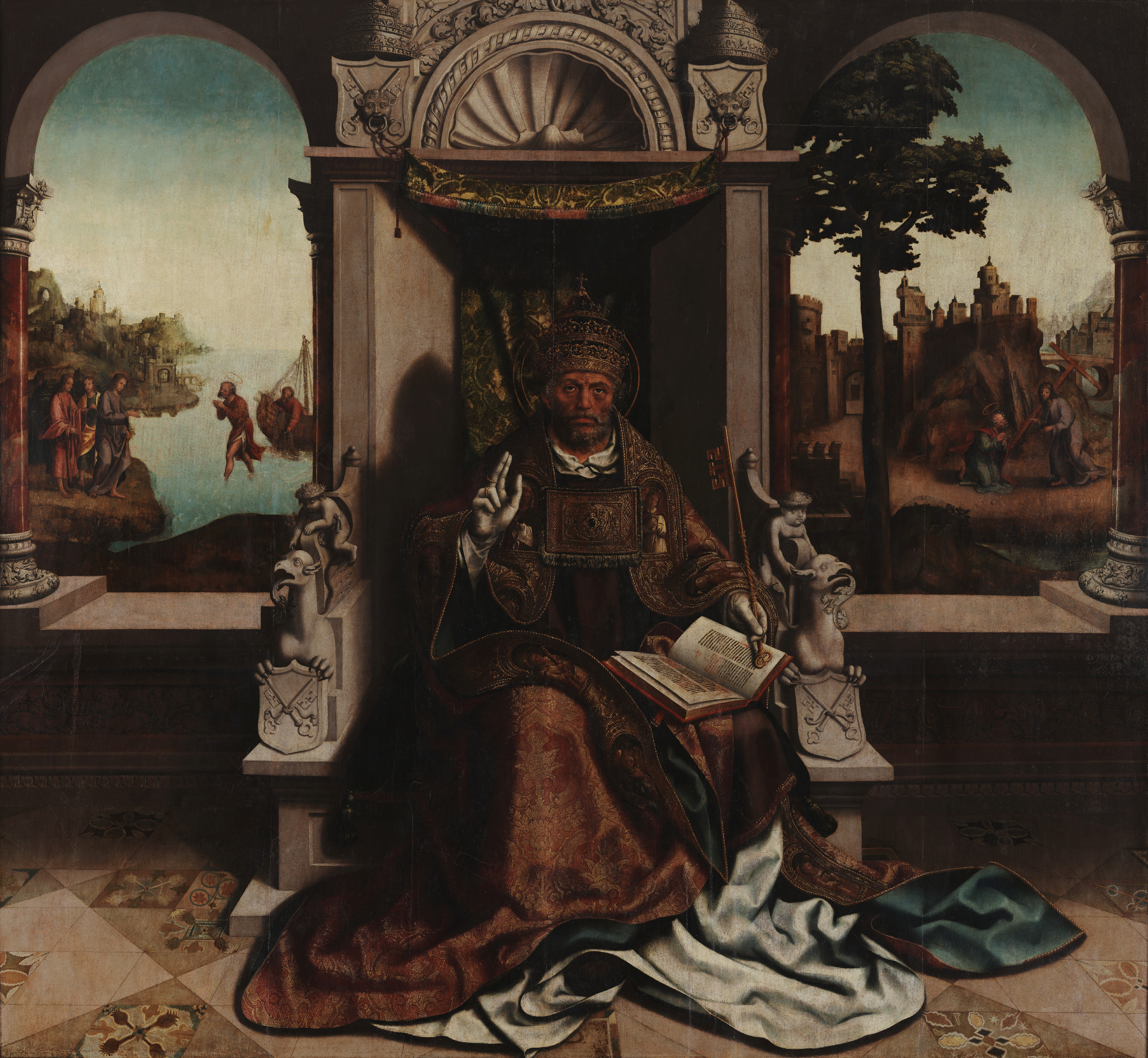
Saint Peter Enthroned as Pope, by Vasco Fernandes

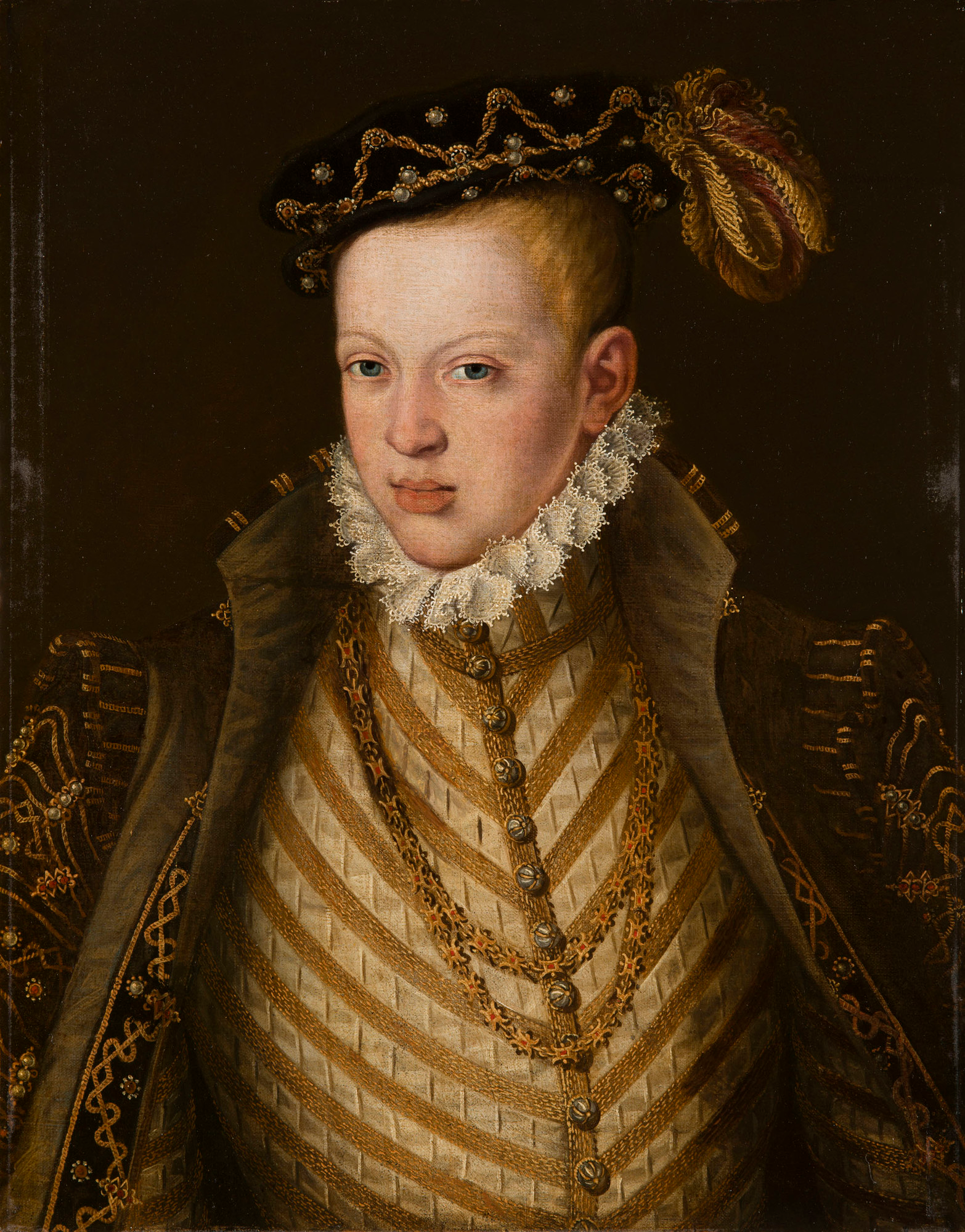
Portrait of Sebastian I of Portugal, by Cristóvão de Morais

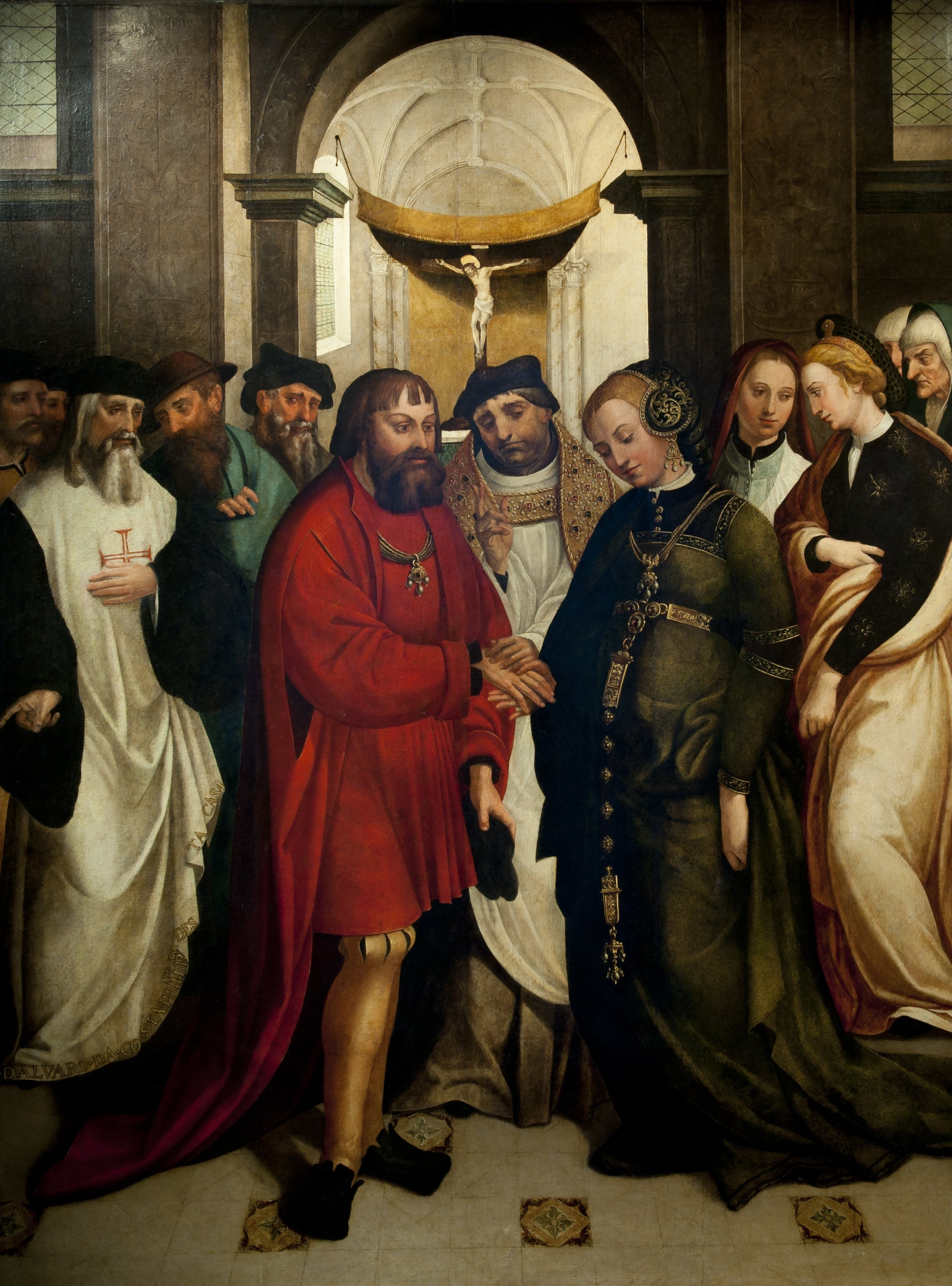
Marriage of D. Manuel I, as Saint Aleixo, and Maria of Aragon, as his wife, by Garcia Fernandes

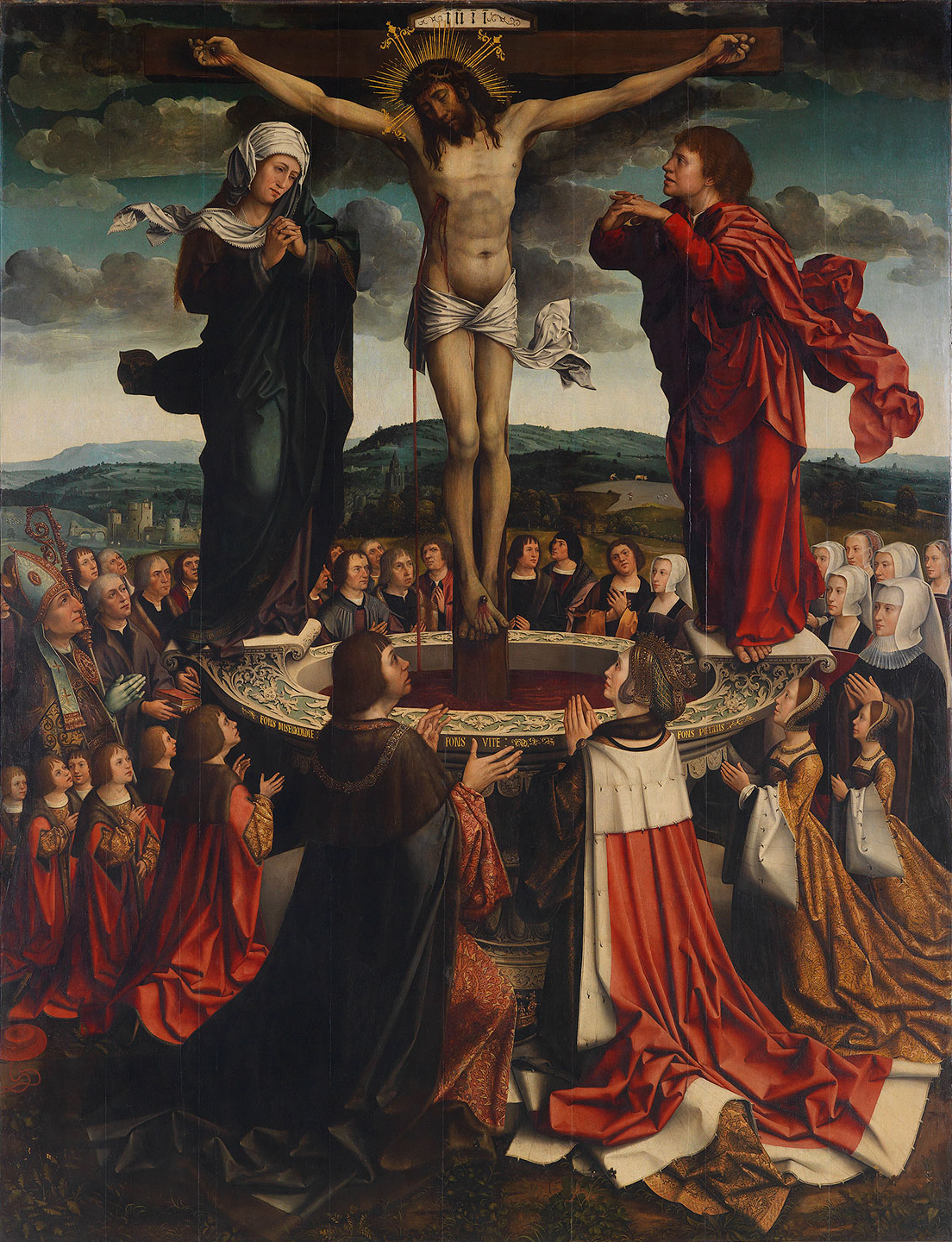
Family of King D. Manuel I at the Fons Vitae; Colijn de Coter

== Sciences ==
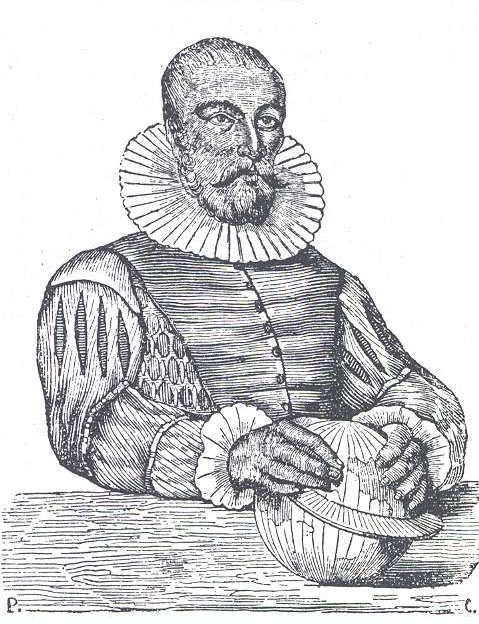
Pedro Nunes was a great scientist of Europe, innovating maths and inventing many devices, such as the nonius.

As the pioneer in Age of Discovery, Portugal and its Renaissance attracted experts in astronomy, mathematics, and naval technology, which made Portugal a technical and scientific capital of Europe. During the Portuguese Renaissance, there was a plethora of technical works being created, such as mappa mundi, globes, treatises on the art of sailing, scripts, reports of shipwrecks, itineraries, and studies on tropical medicine.

Among the treatises on astronomy, oceanography, and nautical studies, major works included the following:

- Esmeraldo de Situ Orbis, 1506, Duarte Pacheco Pereira
- Treaty on the Sphere, 1537, Pedro Nunes
- Route Map of the Purple Sea, 1541, João de Castro
- Ars Nautica, 1555, Fernão de Oliveira
- Manuscript on the Production of Naus, 1580, Fernão de Oliveira

Pedro Nunes, one of the first Europeans to apply mathematics to cartography, discovered the concept of rhumb lines, later applied to the Mercator projection, which, in 1569, revolutionized cartography. He was also the inventor of several measuring apparatus, including the nonius, to measure fractions of a degree.

With Vasco da Gama's arrival in India and the Portuguese Empire's expansion into that land, many scientists were sent eastward to study and compile new drugs from medicinal plants. The botanist Tomé Pires and physicians Garcia de Orta and Cristóvão da Costa collected and published works on new plants and local medicines.

=== Cartography ===
Portuguese portolan chart were in great demand in Europe, for their greater knowledge and accuracy. Although protected as a state secret, the cartographic knowledge would eventually be passed clandestinely by some of those involved in the operation. One such example is the Cantino planisphere, which was stolen from the Casa da Índia, the Portuguese royal ministry for all things maritime, for the Duke of Ferrara in 1502, or the Dieppe maps, commissioned by Henry II of France and Henry VIII of England, which were copies of stolen Portuguese maps of the period.

In 1475, for the first time a Latin translation of Ptolemy's world map, from the second century, was printed. Portuguese exploration and studies soon revealed the gaps of ancient knowledge, such as how in 1488, passing the Cape of Good Hope, Bartolomeu Dias proved Ptolemy was erroneous in that there was no passage to the Indian Ocean.

In 1492, Martin Behaim, after his training in Portugal, and in service to the King of Portugal, built the first known globe, which had Europe and Asia were separated by a single ocean, a theory that Christopher Columbus, who was also trained in Portugal, would test later that year.

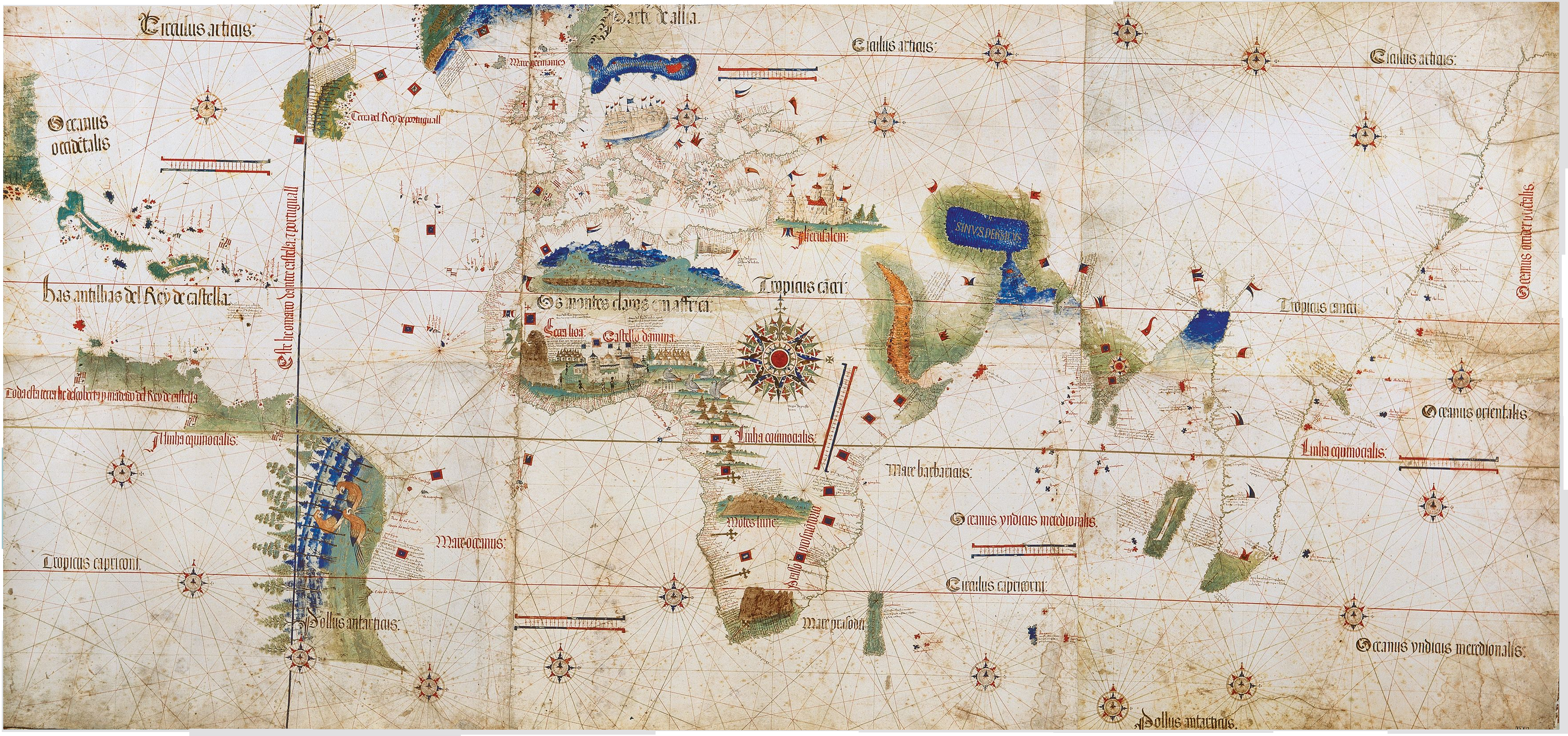
The 1502 Cantino planisphere was the Padrão Real made by the Casa da Índia

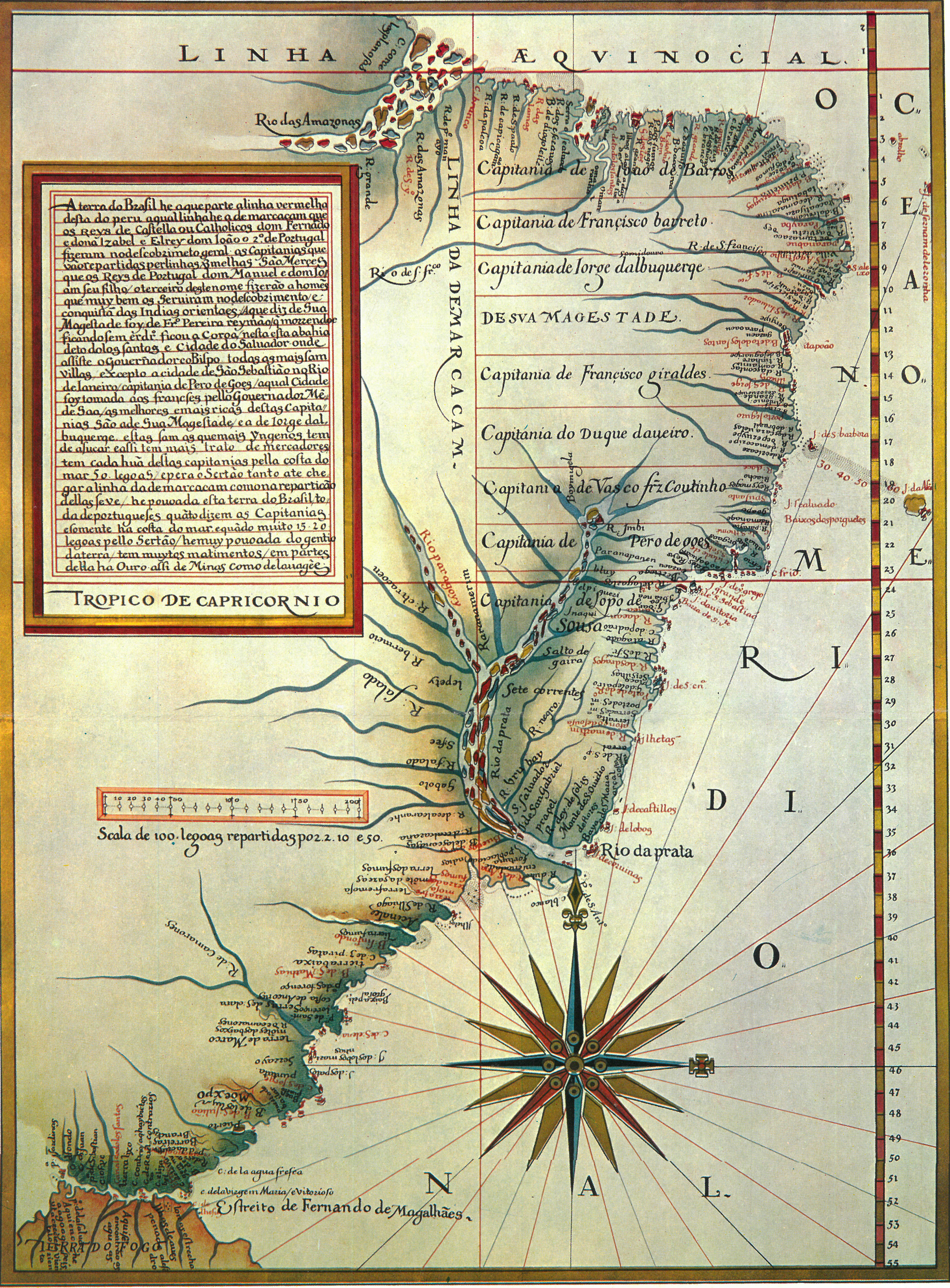
The 1574 map of the Captaincy Colonies of Brazil, by Luís Teixeira

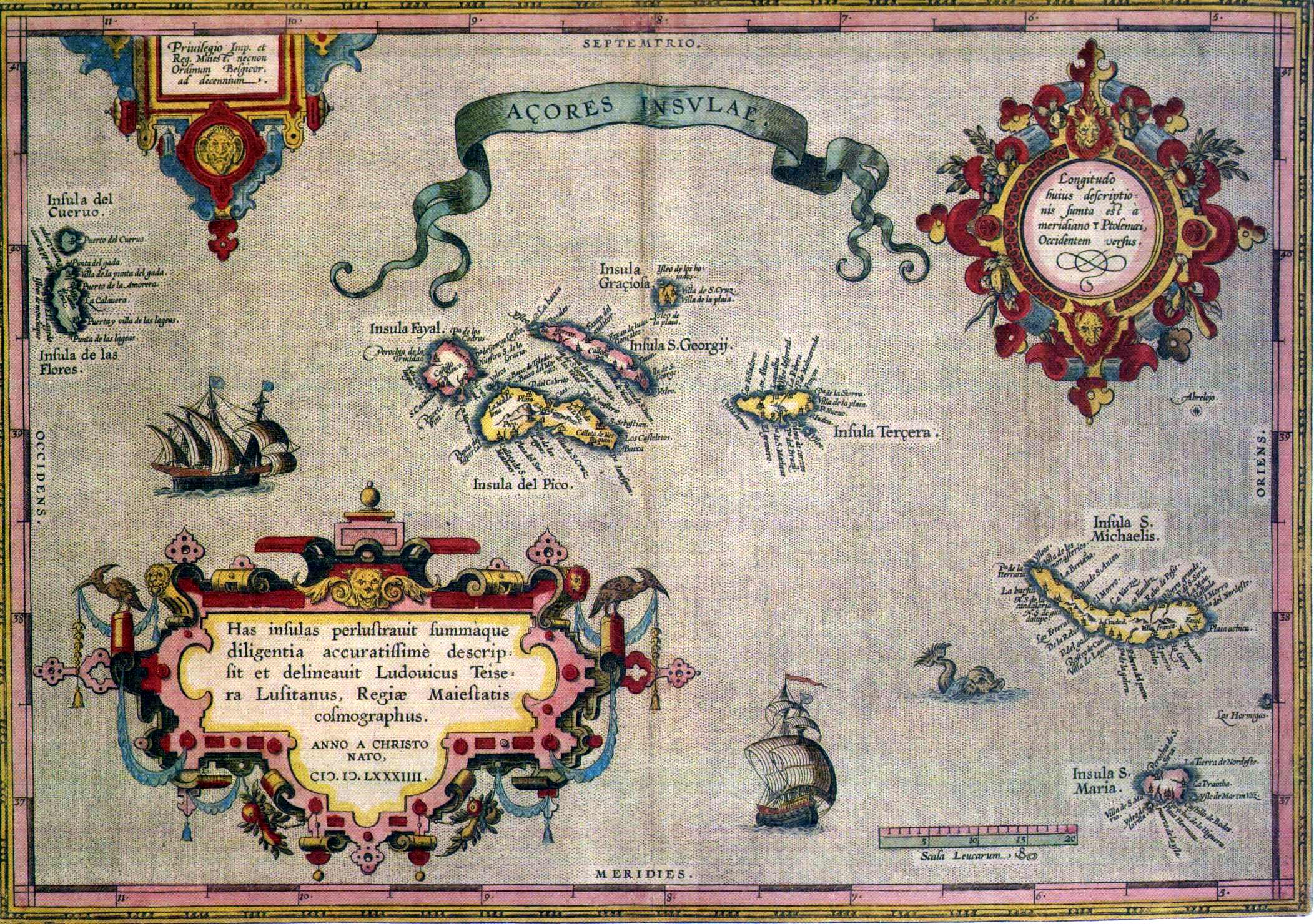
The 1584 Açores Insulae map of the Azores Islands, by Luís Teixeira

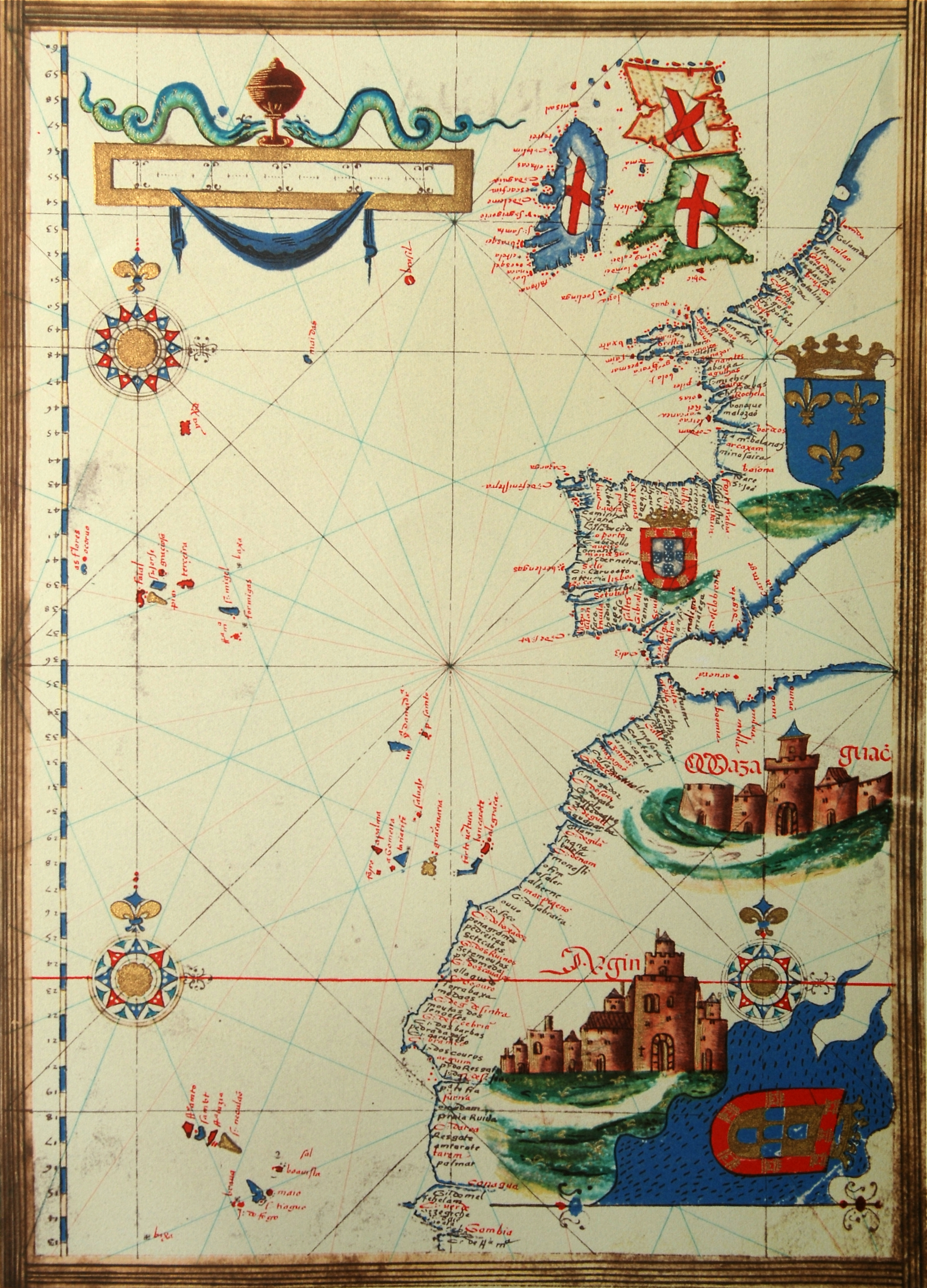
The 1575 map of Portugal and its African colonies, by Sebastião Lopes

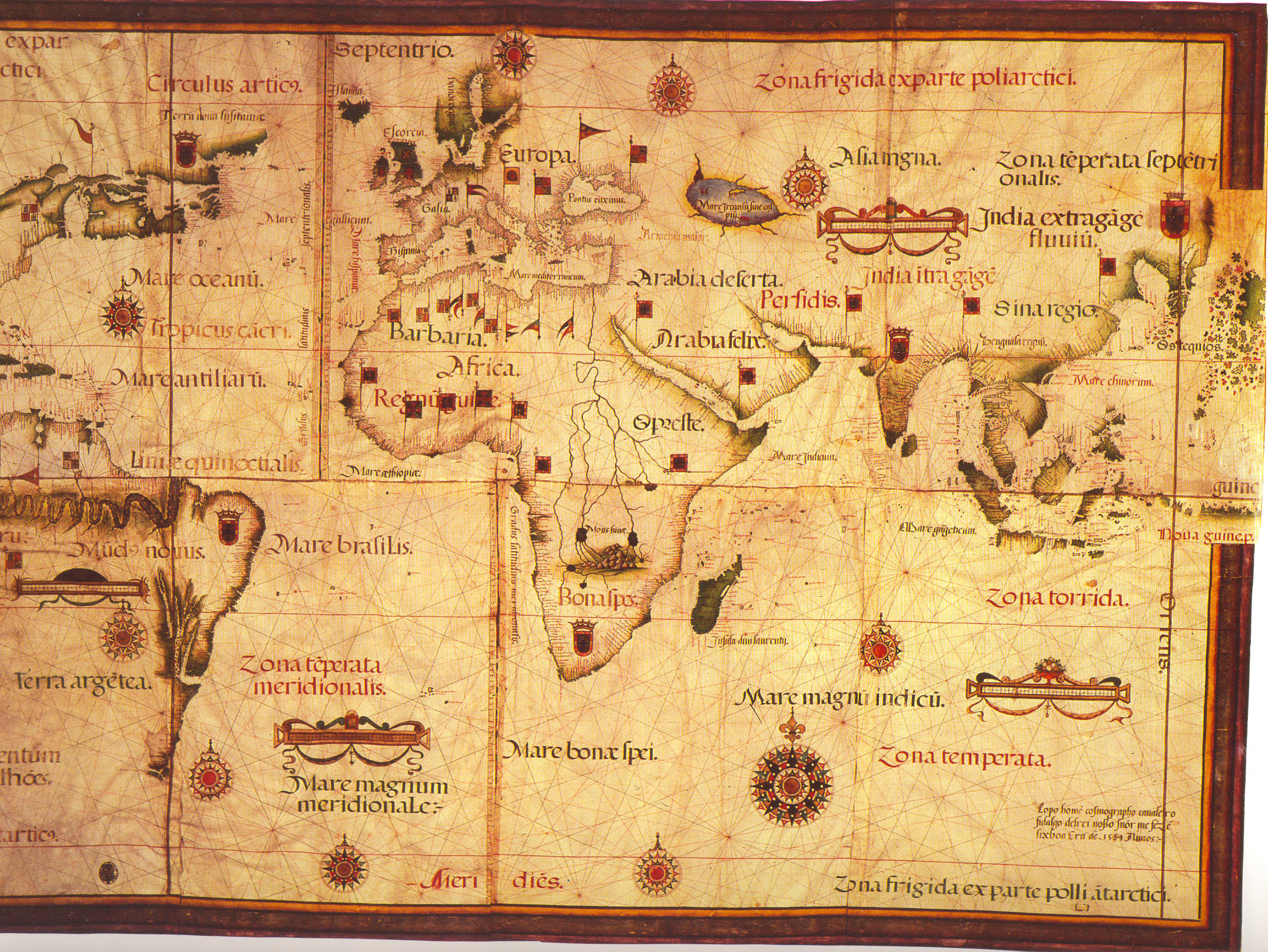
The 1554 map showing the global Portuguese Empire, by Lopo Homem

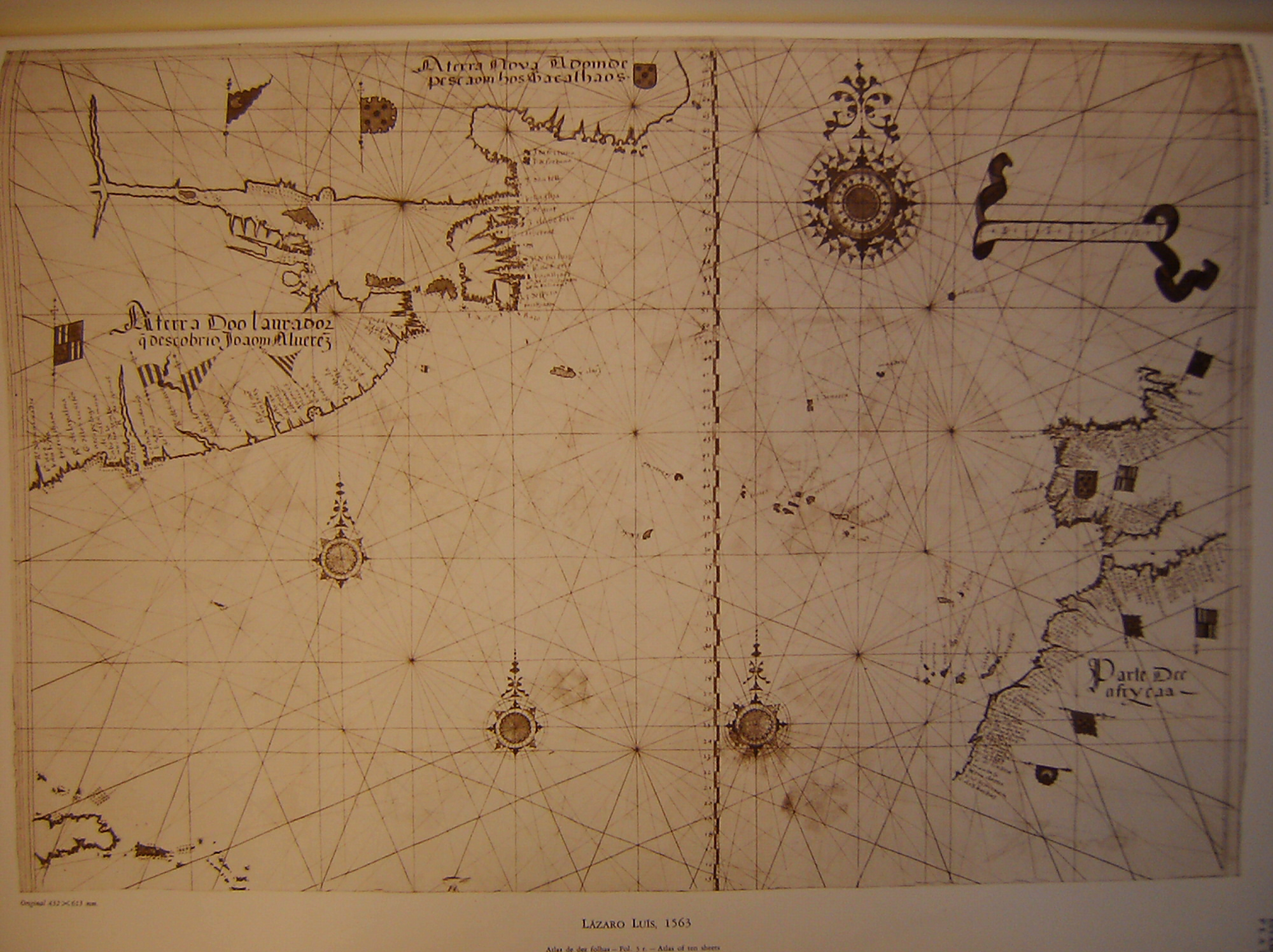
The 1563 map of the North Atlantic Portuguese Empire, by Lazaro Luis

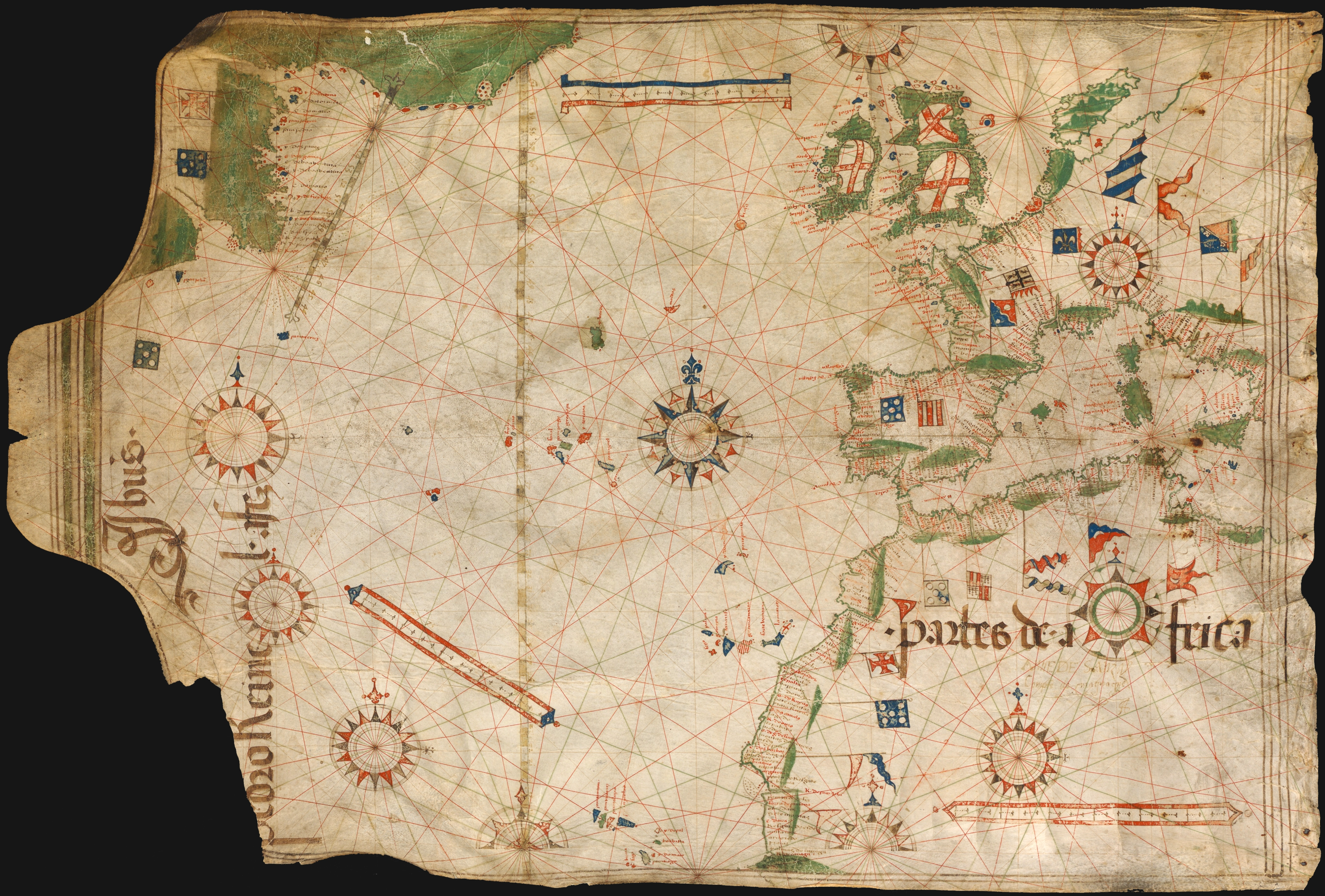
The 1504 map of North Africa and Europe, by Pedro Reinel

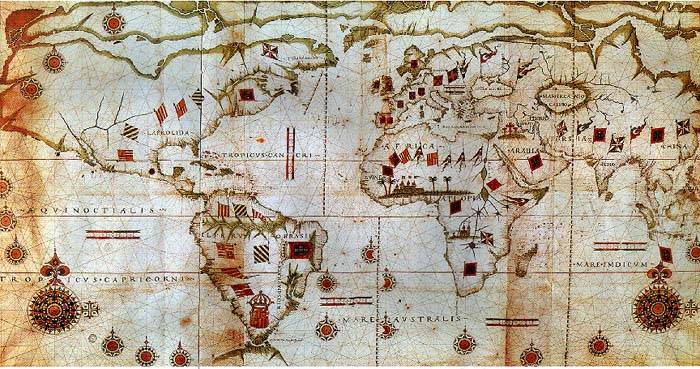
The 1583 map of global European empires, by Sebastião Lopes

== Humanities ==
In Portugal, as in the rest of Europe, the printing press played a key role in its Renaissance. The first printing presses came to Portugal by the hand of Jewish printers via Italy. The first book printed in Portuguese in Portugal was the Sacramental, printed in Chaves, in 1488, by Clemente Sanches de Vercial. By 1490, books were being printed in Lisbon, Porto, and Braga. Because of the new access to mass production of language and literature pieces, the Portuguese Renaissance saw a great flourishment for written work, from treatises to theatre, as well as the advancement and sophistication of the Portuguese language. Because of Portugal's key place in global relations, at the time, literary works of the Portuguese Renaissance influenced a great deal of foreign literary movements and linguistic studies.

=== Language ===
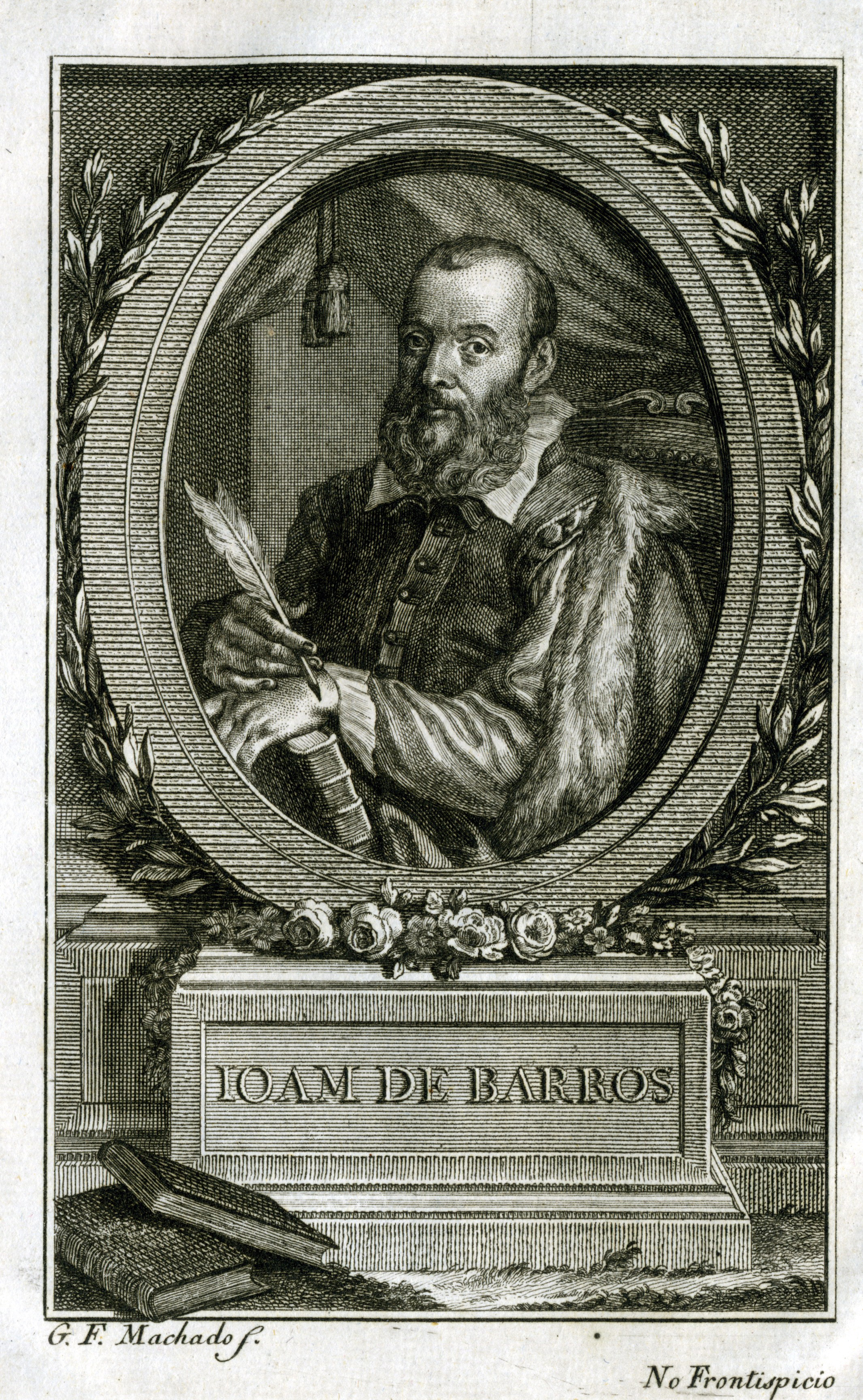
João de Barros was a true man of the Portuguese Renaissance, having been a military man, historian, and grammaticist.

The Portuguese Renaissance produced a plethora of poets, historians, critics, theologians, and moralists, of whom the Portuguese Renaissance was their golden age. Language was one of the purest parts of the Portuguese Renaissance, due to the large number of erudite words imported from classical Latin and ancient Greek, which greatly increased the complexity of the Portuguese language. The sixteenth century Cancioneiro Geral, by Garcia de Resende, is often agreed upon to mark the end of Old Portuguese and the beginning of Modern Portuguese.

The standardization of the Portuguese language started in 1536, when Fernão de Oliveira published his Grammatica da lingoagem portuguesa, the first literary piece that laid rules and standards for the Portuguese language. In 1540, João de Barros, a distinguished officer of the Portuguese crown, published the Grammatica da Língua Portuguesa com os Mandamentos da Santa Madre Igreja, which taught the standards of the Portuguese language alongside the morals and culture of the Portuguese people. João de Barros's Grammatica was the second piece that sought to standardize the Portuguese language, and is considered the world's first illustrated text book.

The great interest in philology, during the Portuguese Renaissance, spread the use of etymological spellings, creating Portuguese words through justification of their Latin roots. The 1576 Orthographia da lingoa portuguesa, by Duarte Nunes de Leão, a great pioneer in the study of Portuguese orthography, was one of the major works in support for the greater Latinisation of the Portuguese language. The printing press was key in the expansion of the Portuguese language, allowing new spellings, words, and grammar to be seen by most Portuguese speakers.

Due to the success of the Portuguese Empire, and the padroado of the Portuguese missionary efforts, the Portuguese language came to be known as the "Christian language" in many parts of Asia. In concordance with the principles of the Portuguese Renaissance, many schools of learning and colleges were founded throughout Portugal and its empire.

It was the scholars of the Portuguese Renaissance that compiled some of the first interlingua dictionaries and literary works, able to do so because of the great distribution of the Portuguese Empire. These dictionaries were often the first linguistic interactions Europeans had to these far east cultures, such as the 1580 Chinese-Portuguese Dictionary, by Miguel Ruggeiro and Mateus Rigo, the 1603 Nippo Jisho Japanese-Portuguese Dictionary, by João Rodrigues, and the 1651 Dictionarium Annamiticum Lusitanum et Latinum Portuguese-Latin-Vietnamese Dictionary, by Alexandre de Rhodes.

Because of the great prestige and importance of the Portuguese Renaissance on nautical studies and sciences, most explorers of the time studied in Portugal and carried the Portuguese language to newly discovered lands. Many Portuguese words have entered the lexicon of other languages, such as sepatu, shoe in Indonesian, from the Portuguese sapato, Keju, cheese in Malay, from the Portuguese queijo, meza, table in Swahili, from the Portuguese mesa, and botan, buton, from botão, kappa, cover, from capa, and from the various Japanese words of Portuguese origin. Simultaneously, following the expansionist and knowledge seeking nature of the Portuguese Renaissance, the Portuguese language imported many words from foreign idioms, such as cachimbo, meaning pipe, from the Kimbundu kixima, and algodão, meaning cotton, from the Arabic al-qutun.

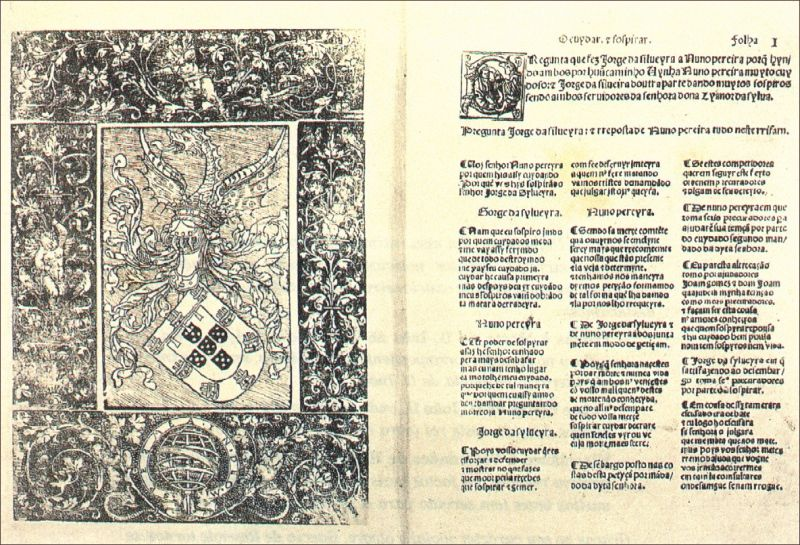
The 1516 Cancioneiro Geral, by Garcia de Resende

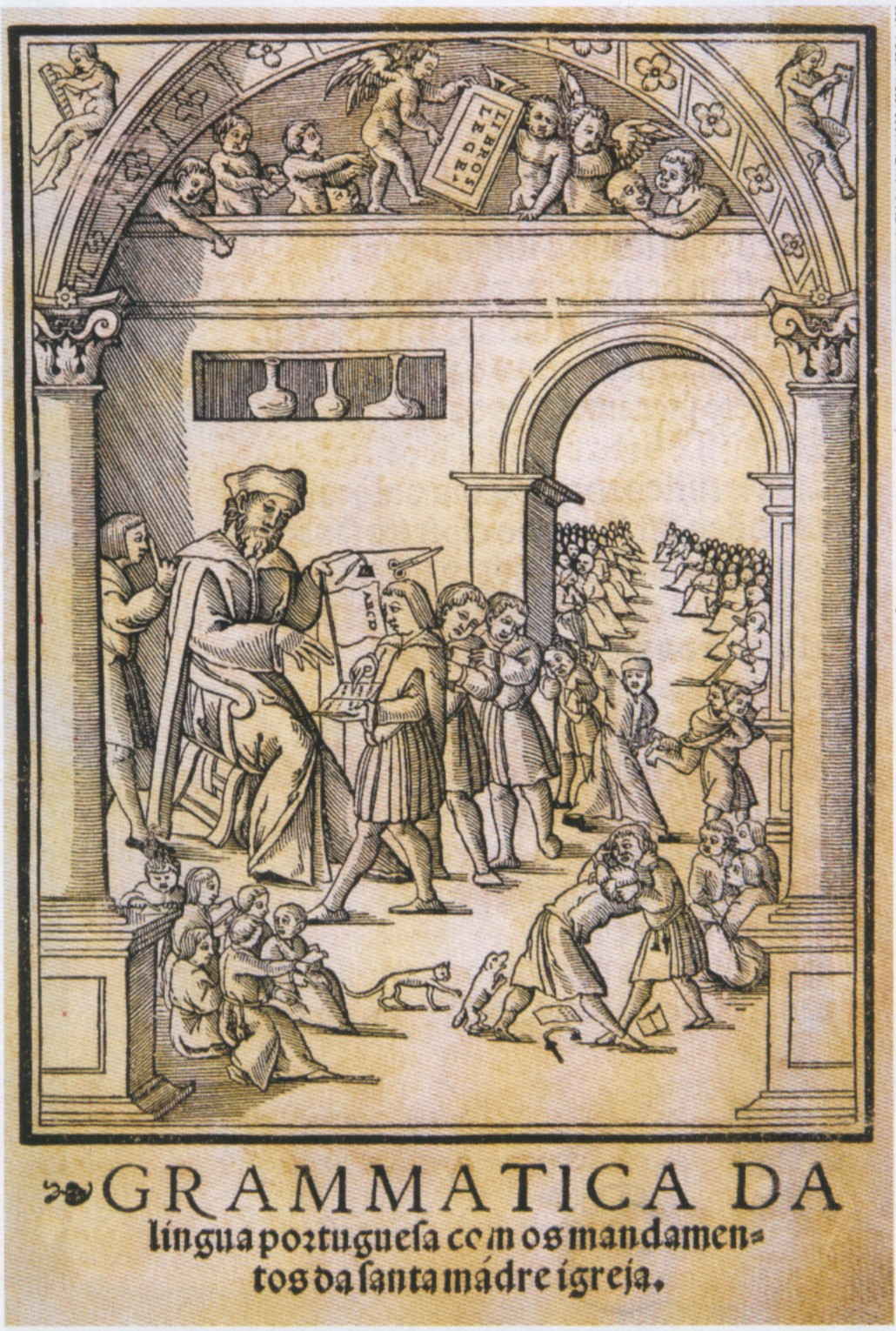
The 1540 Grammatica da Língua Portuguesa com os Mandamentos da Santa Madre Igreja, by João de Barros

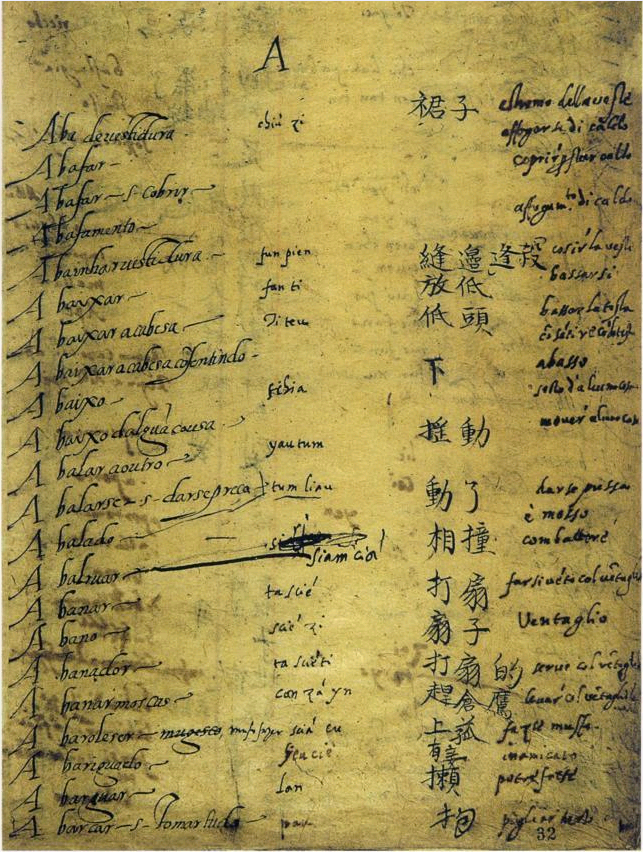
The 1583 Portuguese-Chinese Dictionary, by Miguel Ruggeiro and Mateus Rigo

The 1651 Dictionarium Annamiticum Lusitanum et Latinum, by Alexandre de Rhodes

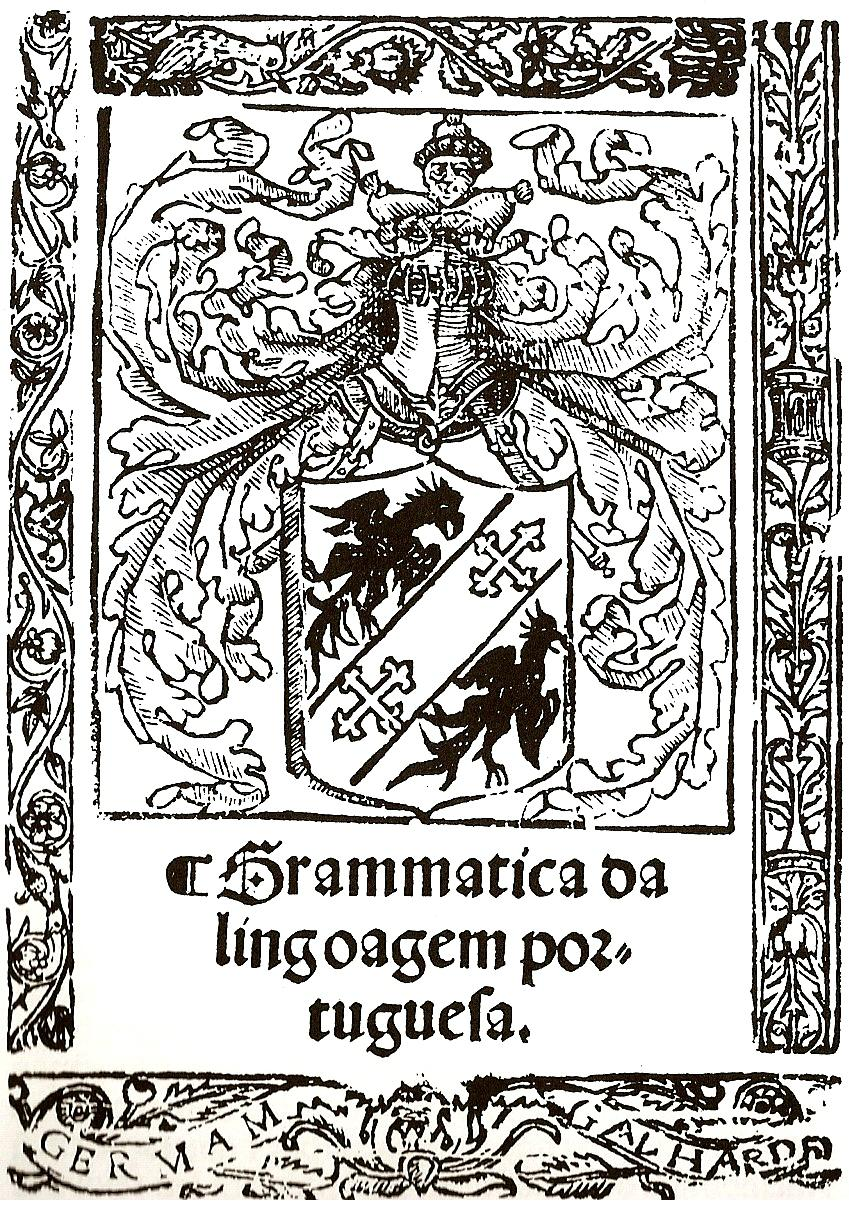
The 1536 Grammatica da lingoagem portuguesa, by Fernão de Oliveira

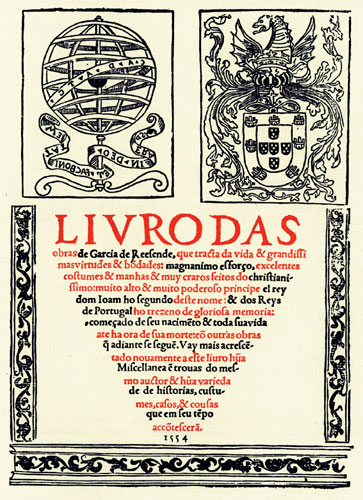
The 1554 Livro das Obras de Garcia de Resende, by Garcia de Resende

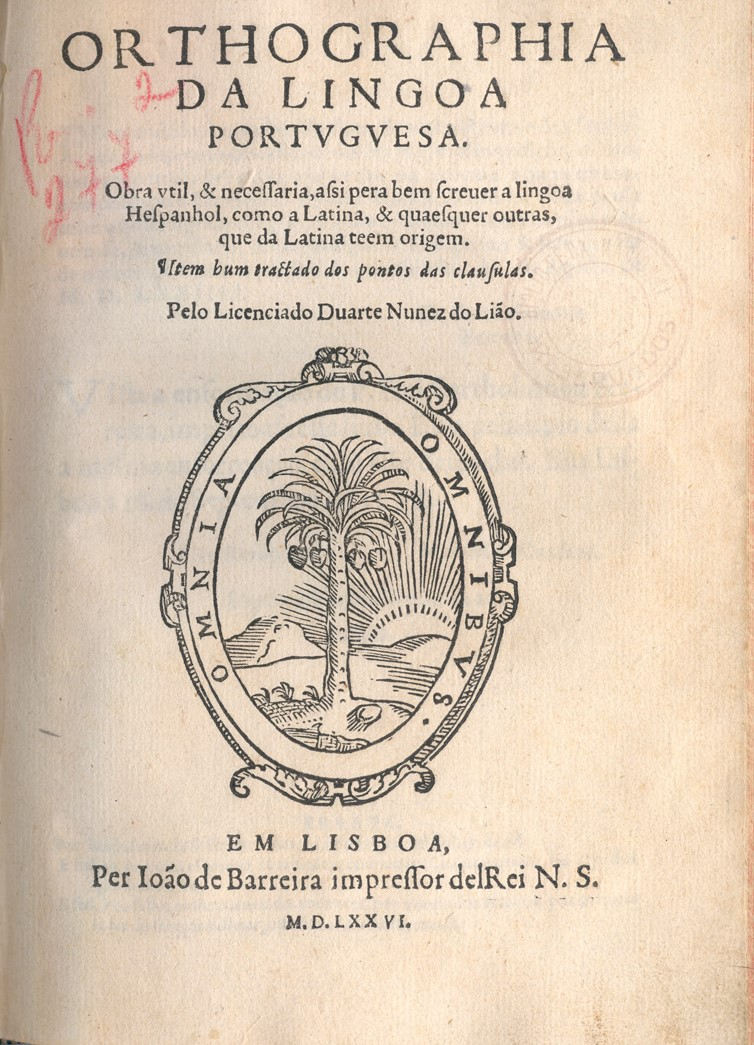
The 1576 Orthographia da lingoa portuguesa, by Duarte Nunes de Leão

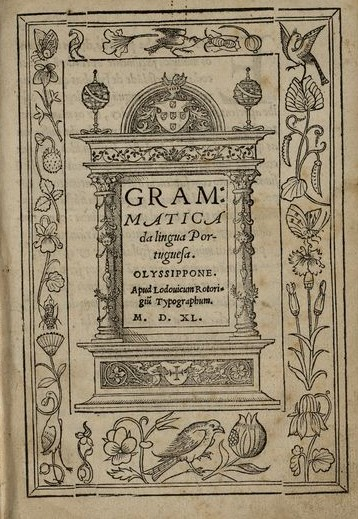
The 1540 Grammatica da Língua Portuguesa com os Mandamentos da Santa Madre Igreja, by João de Barros

=== Literature ===
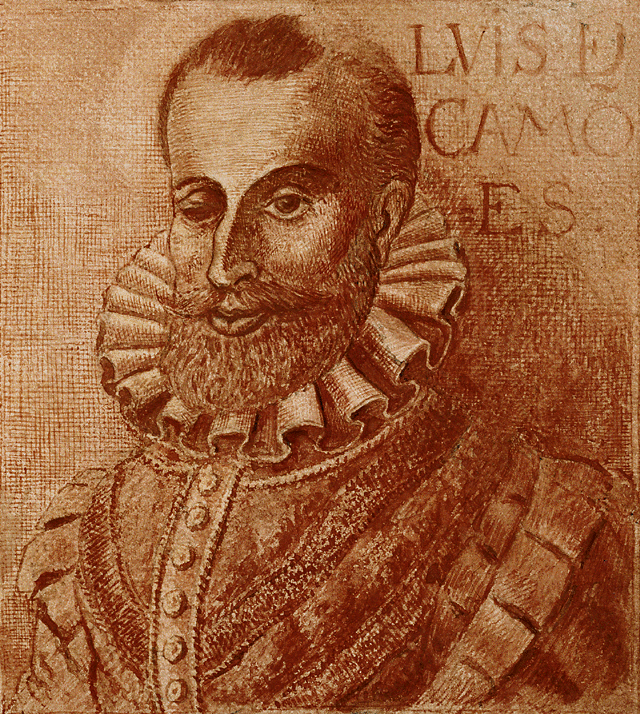
Luís de Camões's contributions to the Portuguese language are so great that it is often dubbed the Language of Camões.

The Portuguese Renaissance was a golden age for literary works in Portugal. The abundance of funds and interest lead to the creation of some of the best known pieces of the Portuguese language. Because of Portugal's importance during the Age of Discovery and strategic location as a waypoint between Europe and the rest of the world, many of these literary works were able to circulate outside of Portugal and achieve popularity throughout Europe.

In 1516, Garcia de Resende published the Cancioneiro General, which contained more than two hundred separate literary works, of various authors, from the reigns of D. Afonso V and D. John II. Among the various authors represented in the Cancioneiro Geral, Francisco de Sá de Miranda, Gil Vicente, and Bernardim Ribeiro were the most important and famous authors to the literary scene of the Portuguese Renaissance. Sá de Miranda was crucial to the internationalization of the literary works of the Portuguese Renaissance. After returning from his studies abroad, in 1526, Sá de Miranda introduced new forms of literary expression to Portugal, like the sonnet and the sestina. From 1502 until 1536, Gil Vicente wrote and staged forty one pieces of drama, both in Portuguese and Castilian, including mysteries, farces, comedies, and tragedies, which would earn him a space in history as the "Father of Iberian drama". Bernardim Ribeiro introduced the Pastoral novel to the Iberian Peninsula with his 1554 Menina e Moça, alongside the eclogues of Cristóvão Falcão.

From the Portuguese Renaissance, there was no greater writer than Luís de Camões, whose treasured works have nicknamed the Portuguese language as the Language of Camões. Camões was instrumental in reintroducing classical forms of literature, most importantly the epic, through his 1572 masterpiece, Os Lusíadas, considered one of the greatest pieces of Portuguese literature from all time.

During the Portuguese Renaissance, chivalric romances were a literary phenomenon of the Iberian Peninsula, and of Europe as a whole, to a lesser extent. These novels based themselves on the idealization of mediaeval chivalric codes, and were filled with princes and princesses, knights and damsels, and almost always had a Christian moral. This type of novel was best personified in the 1508 version of João de Lobeira's Amadis de Gaula by Garci Rodríguez de Montalvo, the 1541 Cronica do famoso e muito esforçado cavalleiro Palmeirim d´Inglaterra by Francisco de Moraes, and the 1522 Crónica do Imperador Clarimundo, by João de Barros.

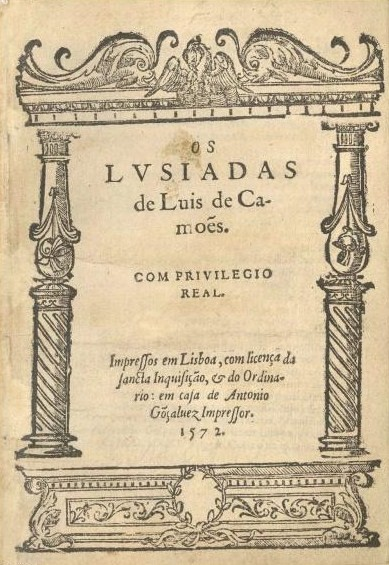
The 1572 Os Lusíadas, by Luís de Camões

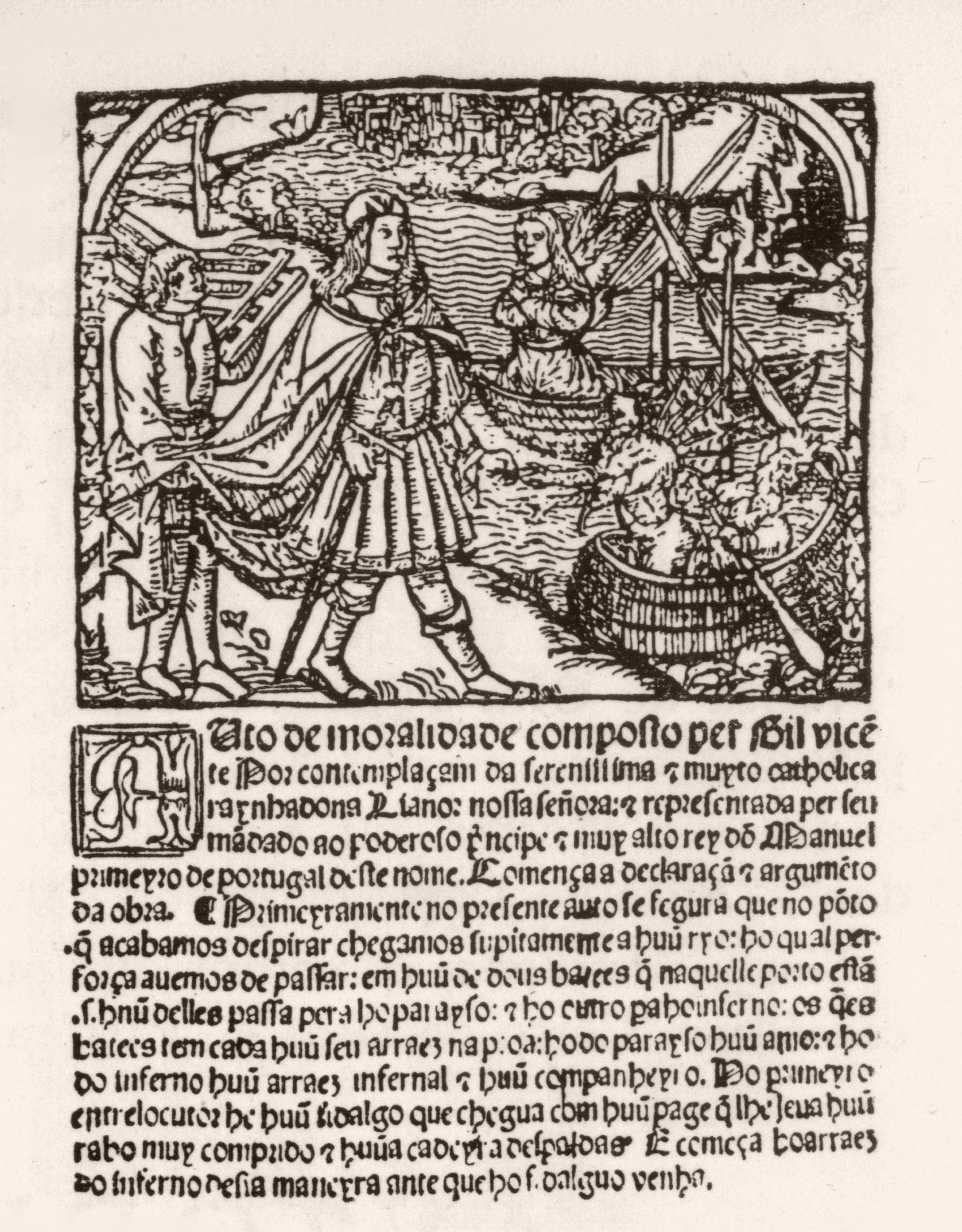
The 1517 Auto da Barca do Inferno, by Gil Vicente

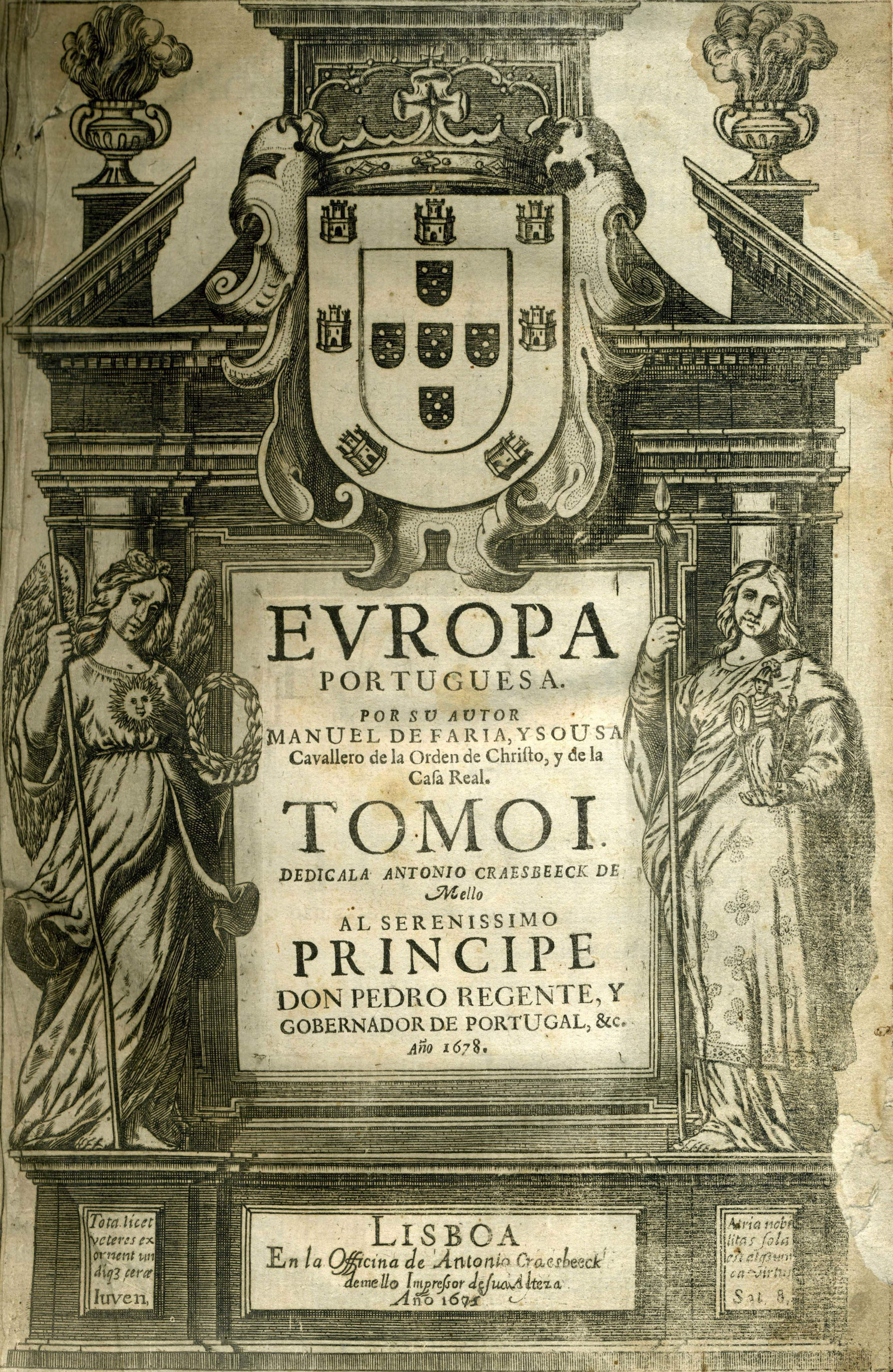
The 1675 Europa Portuguesa, by Manuel de Faria e Sousa

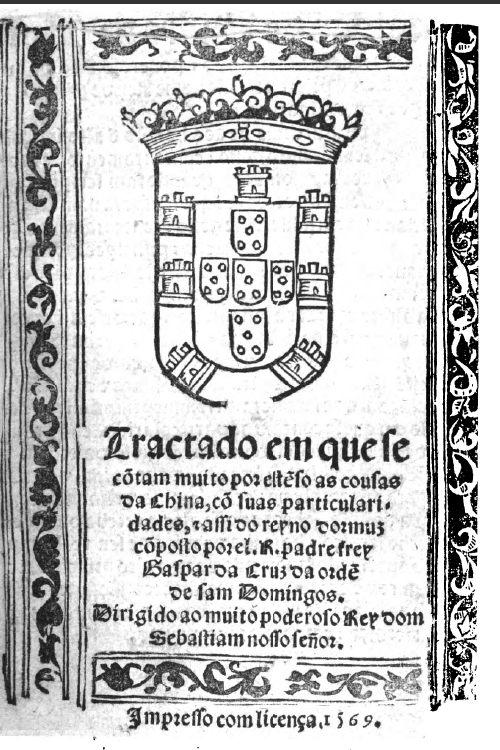
The 1569 Tratado das Cousas da China, by Gaspar da Cruz

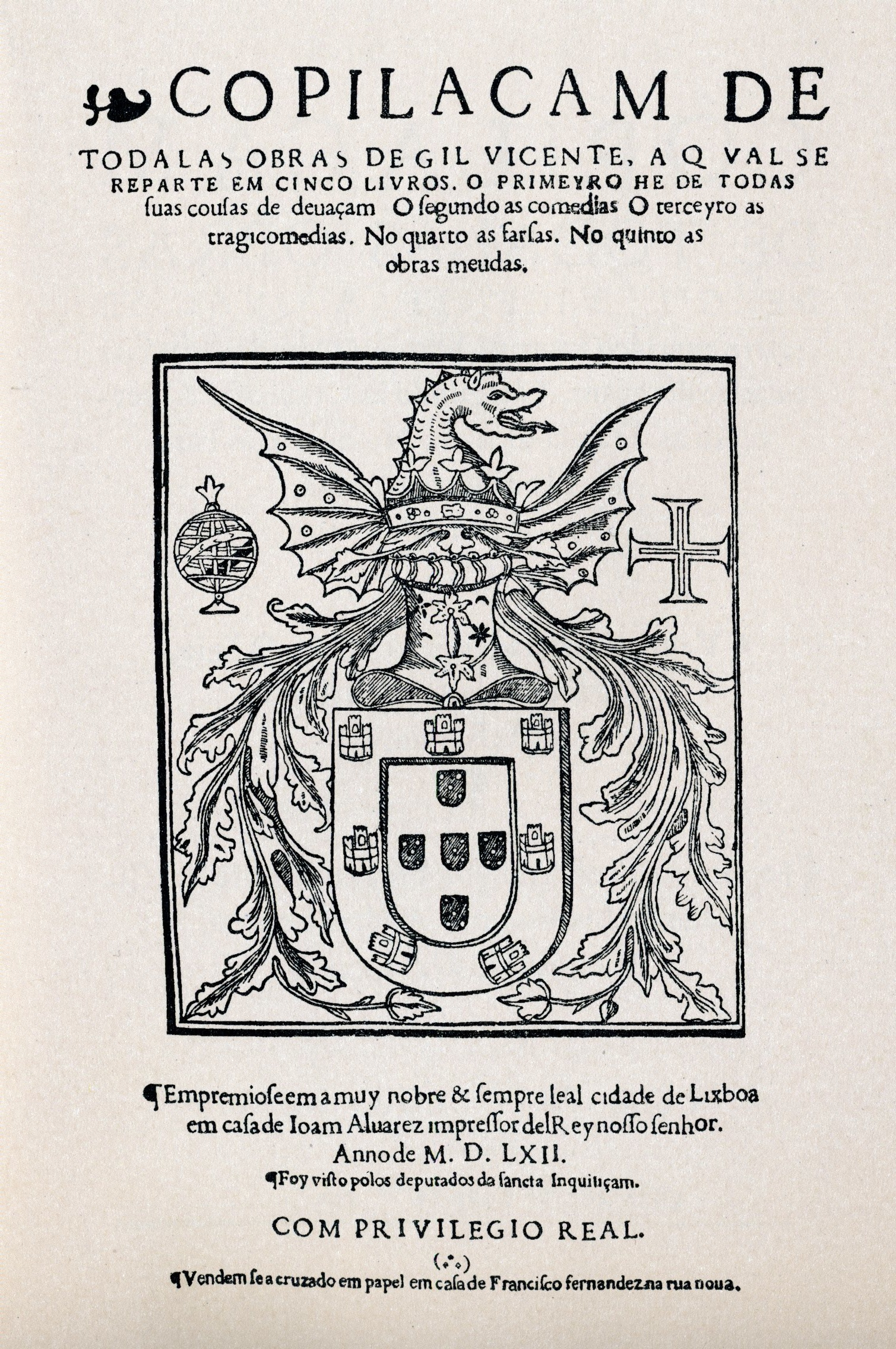
The 1562 Compilaçam de Todalas Obras, by Gil Vicente

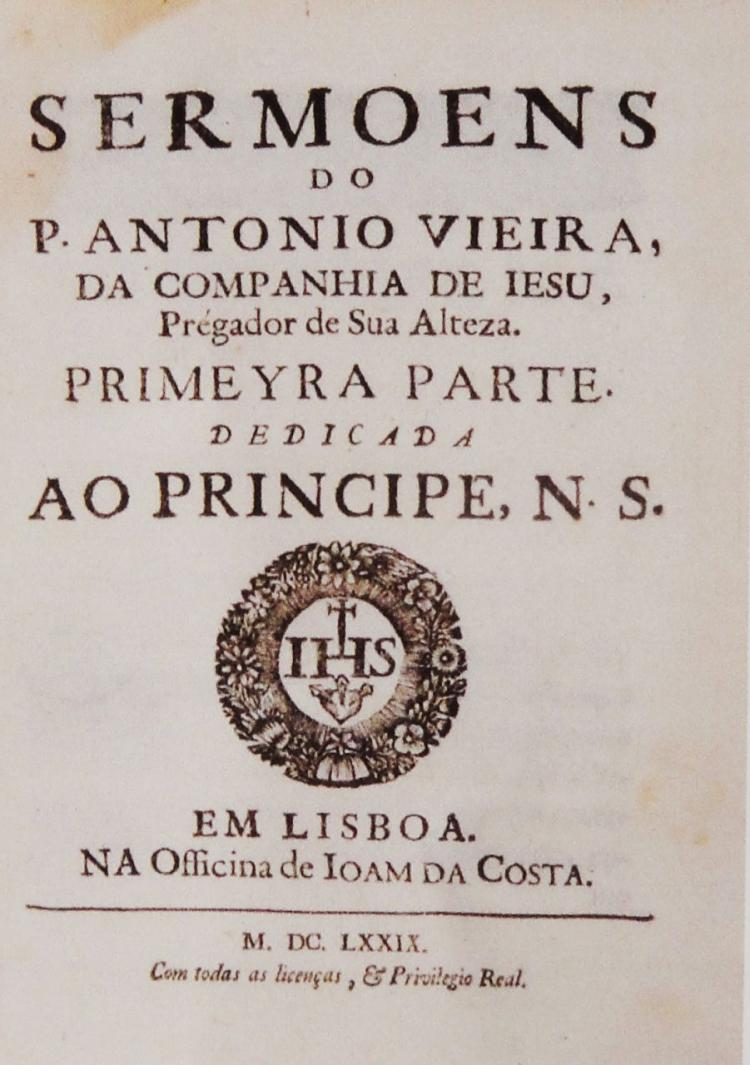
The 1679 Sermões, by António Vieira

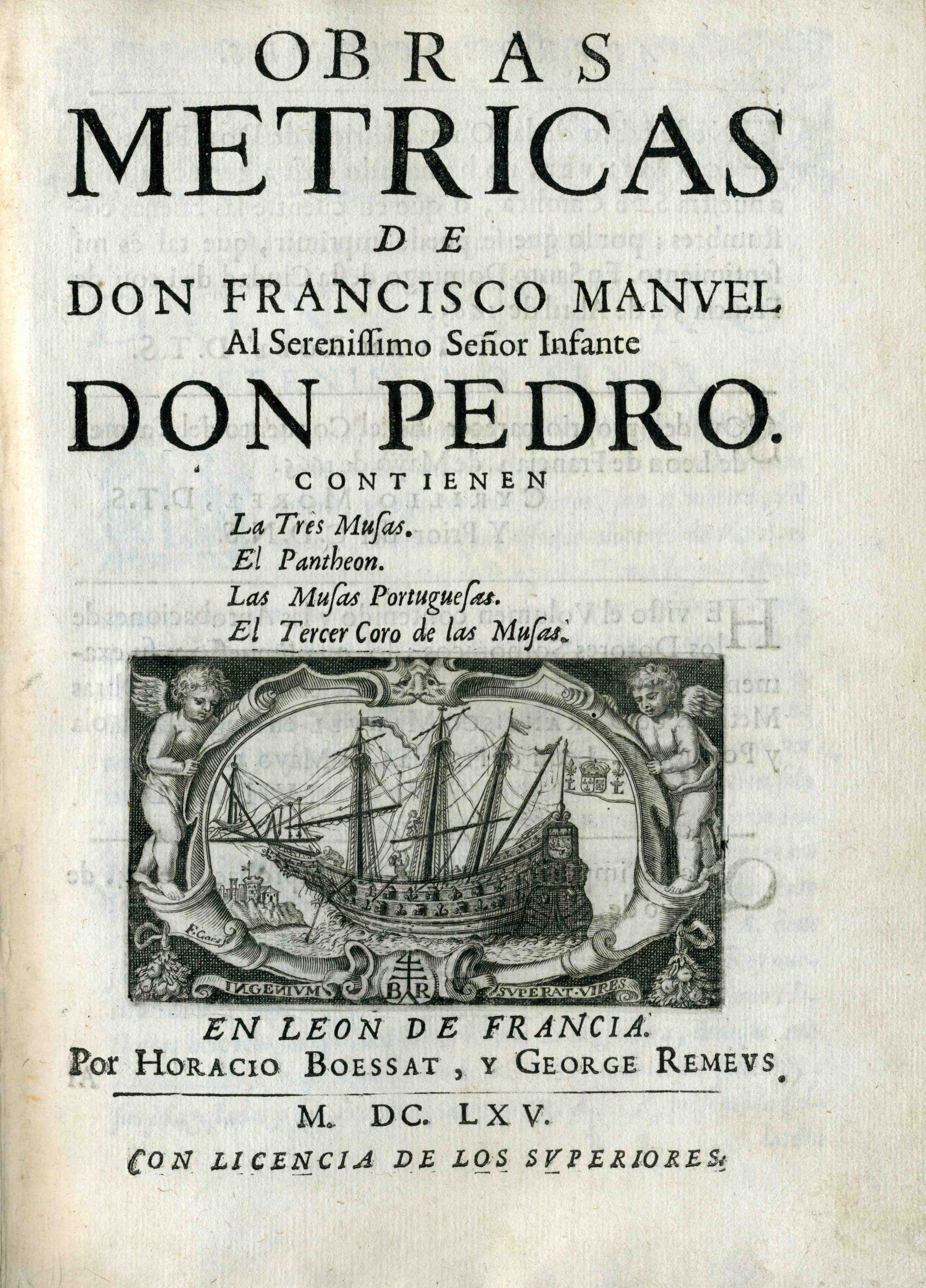
The 1665 Obras Métricas, by Francisco Manuel de Mello

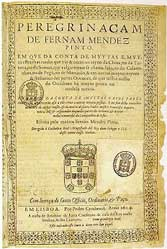
The 1614 Peregrinação, by Fernão Mendes Pinto
