= Cristóvão de Morais =

- Known for: Renaissance art
- Movement: Portuguese Renaissance
- Patrons: John III of Portugal; Sebastian I of Portugal

Cristóvão de Morais was a 16th-century Portuguese court painter for the kings John III of Portugal and Sebastian I of Portugal. He painted numerous portraits for the kings, queens, and princes of Portugal.

== Life ==
When he was young, Morais studied in Antwerp. In 1554, he was appointed examiner of painters, an indicator of the degree of esteem in which he was taken by the court. In 1551, he decorated a bed for the queen's chamber D. Catherine, wife of D. John III, which was lost. In 1567 he painted the altarpiece of the church of the Convent of the Conception of Beja, also lost.

His best known works are the two portraits of King Sebastian, one located in Madrid and the other, very similar to the first, now located in the National Museum of Ancient Art, Lisbon. The portrait of Madrid, full-body, is signed and dated "1565 Christoforus Morales faciebat", while Lisbon was probably performed in 1571 at the request of D. Catherine, grandmother of Sebastian. In these works the young king is represented with a cold and challenging, befitting his personality, and wears a splendid armor. According to Vítor Serrão, the portrait of the King "is one of the most transcendent landmarks of the mannerist movement".

== Gallery ==
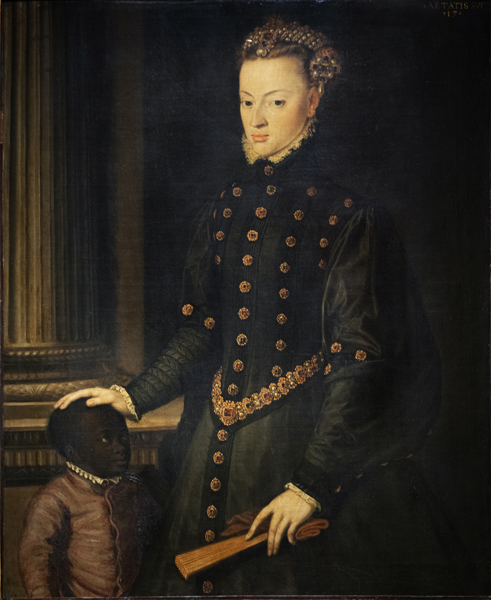
Joanna of Austria; 1551

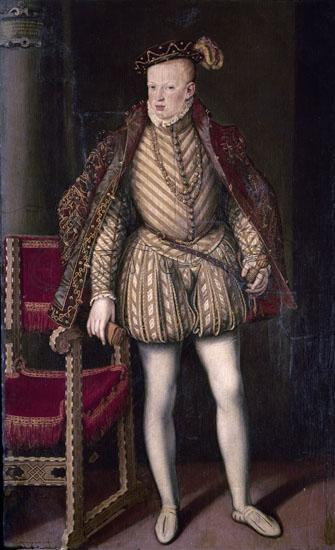
Sebastian; 1565

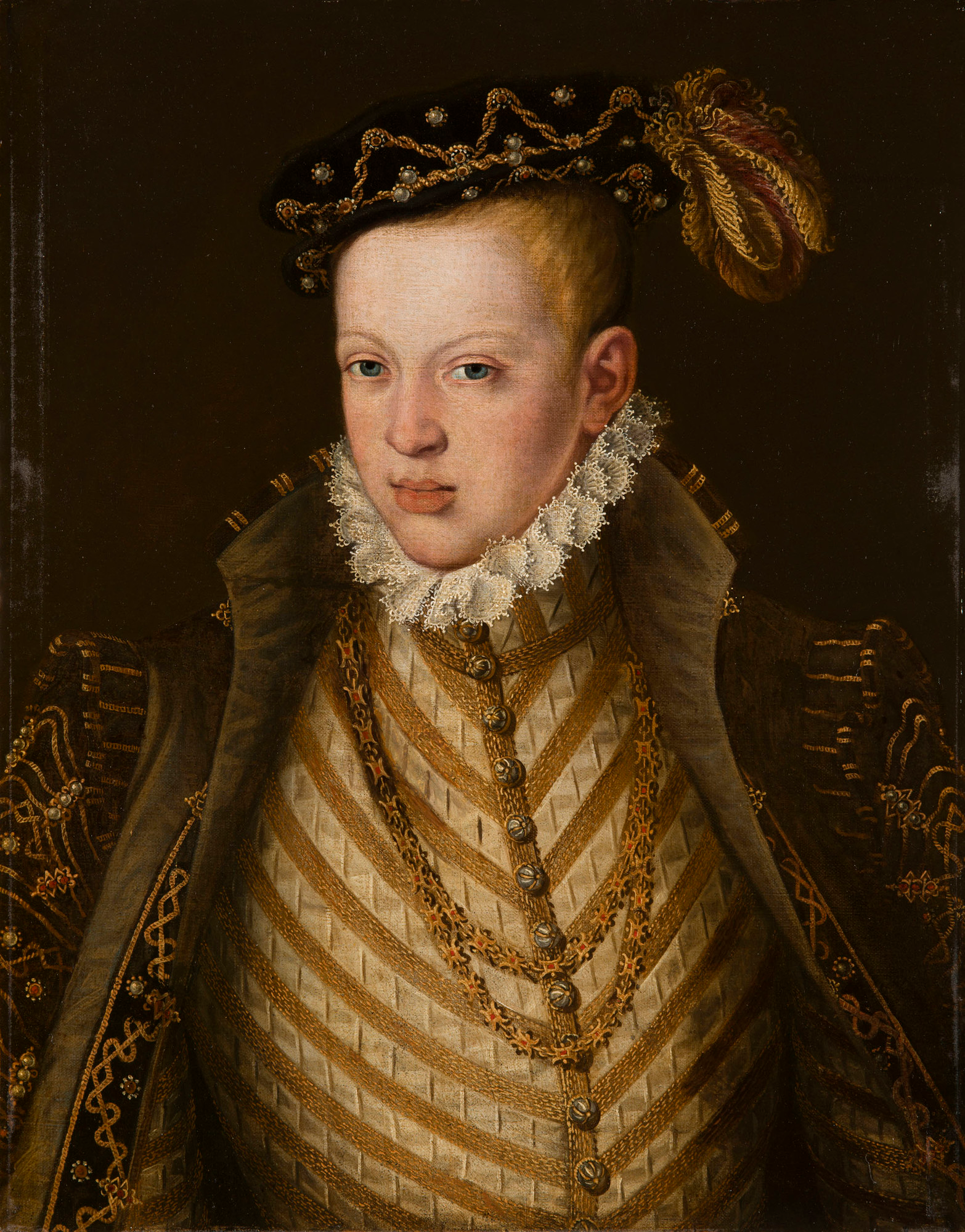
Sebastian; 1565

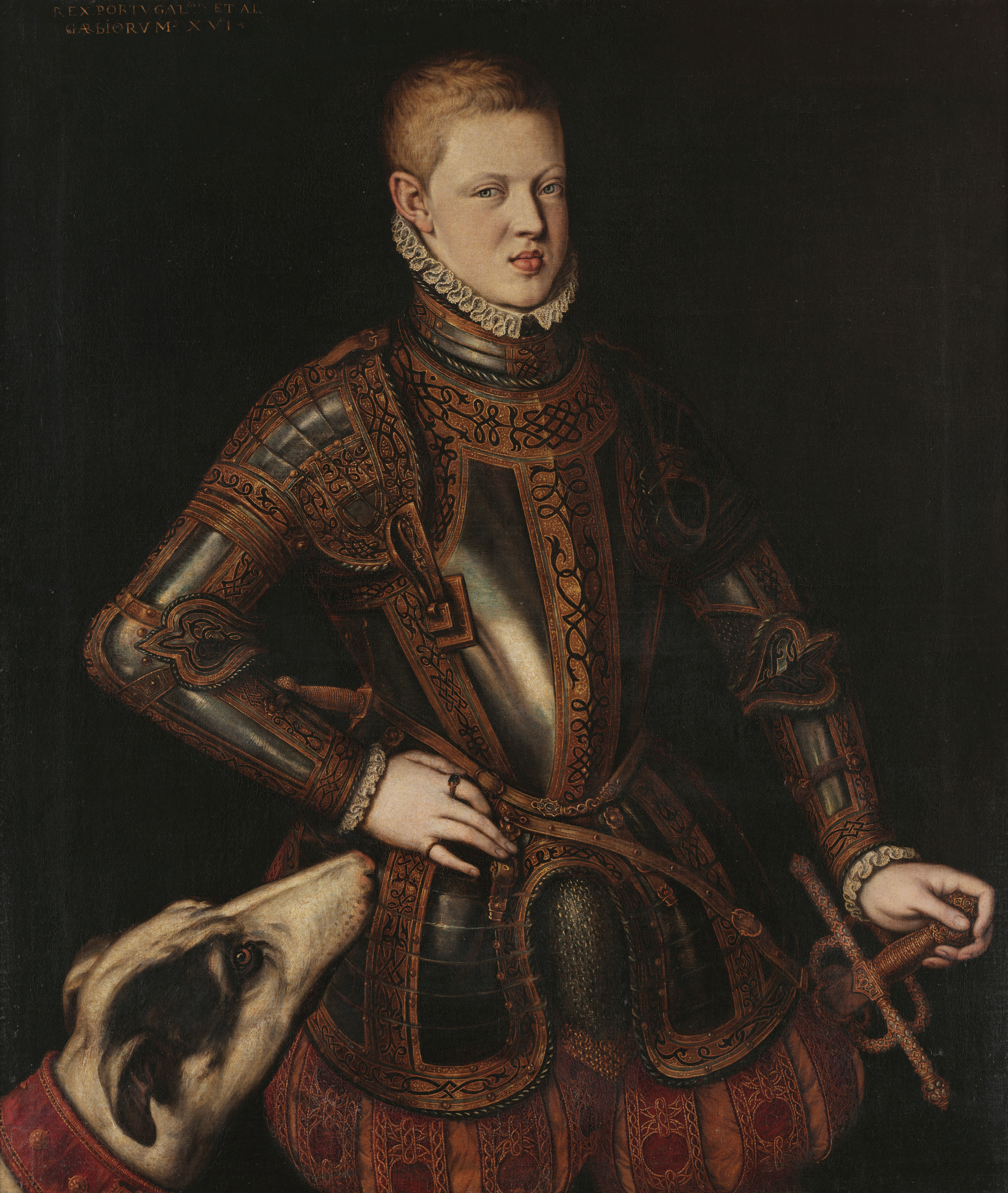
Sebastian; 1571

== See also ==
- Portuguese Renaissance
