= Church of Nossa Senhora da Graça (Évora) =

Church in Alentejo, Portugal

Coordinates: 38.5696°N 7.9072°W

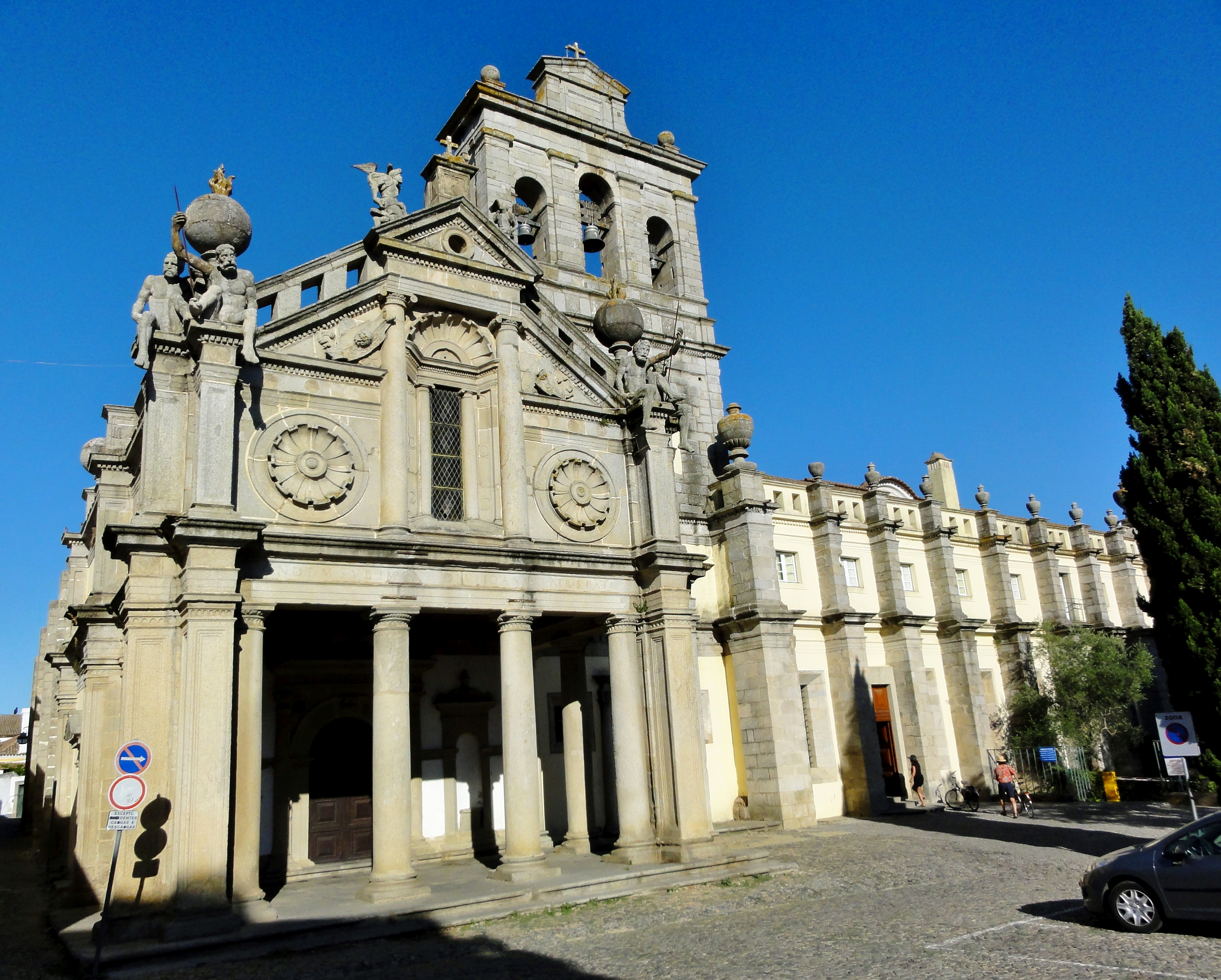
Church and convent Nossa Senhora da Graça at Évora, Portugal.

Igreja da Graça is an old church and convent in Évora, Portugal. Currently this convent is used by the Portuguese Armed Forces.

Its construction was concluded in 1511 and it is now classified as a National Monument, and it is an integral part of Évora's old city centre, which is classified as a UNESCO World Heritage Site.

The building is known for its beautiful details, despite falling into ruins in the early 20ty century.

Burials at the former Augustinian Convent include Publia Hortênsia de Castro, a famous nun.
