= History of prostitution =

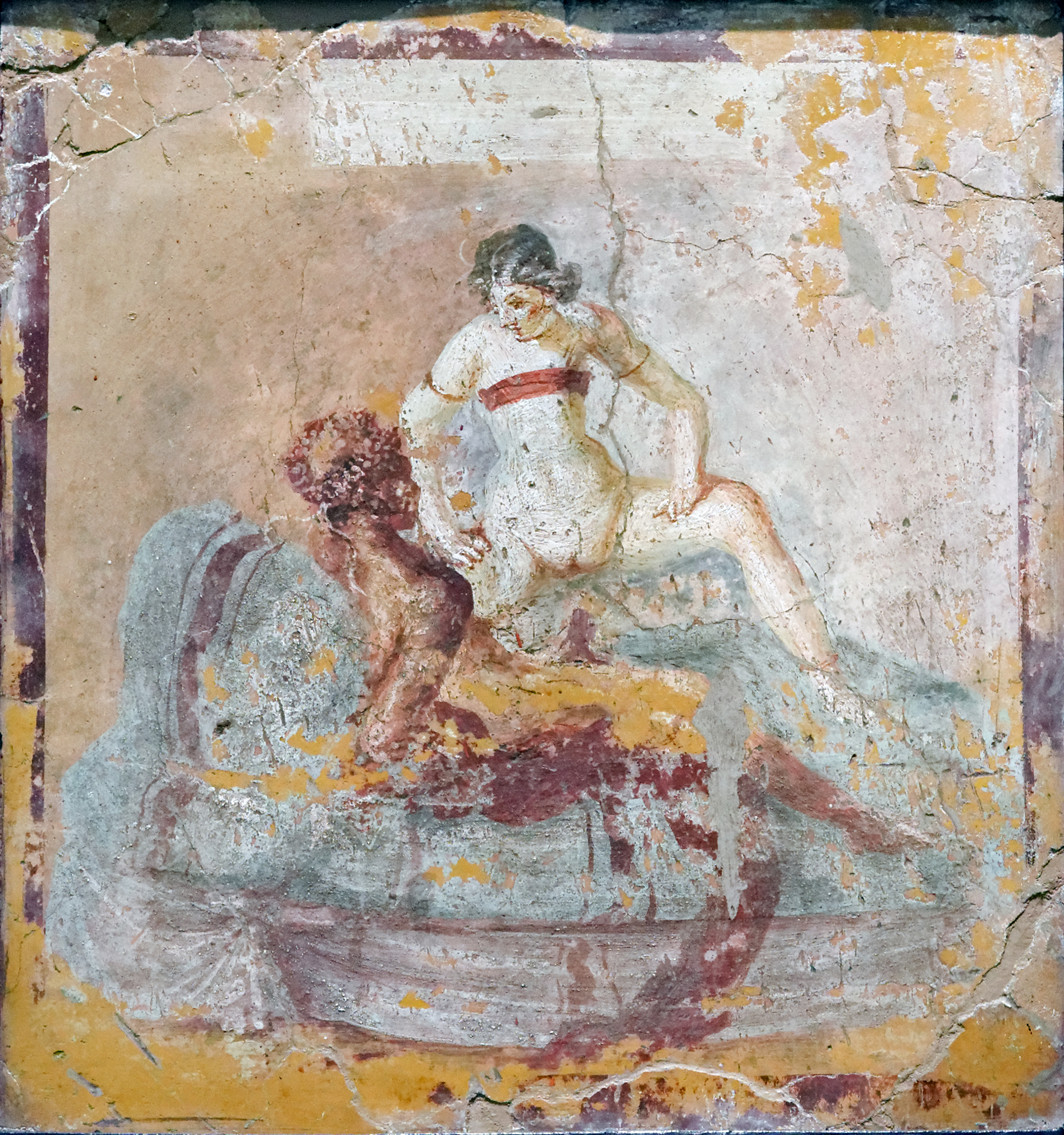
An erotic scene from a fresco of Pompeii, 1-50 AD, Secret Museum, Naples

Prostitution has been practiced throughout ancient and modern cultures. Prostitution has been described as "the world's oldest profession", though this is unverifiable, and most likely incorrect.

== Ancient Near East ==
The Ancient Near East was home to many shrines, temples, or "houses of heaven", which were dedicated to various deities. These shrines and temples were documented by the Greek historian Herodotus in The Histories, where sacred prostitution was a common practice. Sumerian records dating back to ca. 2400 BCE are the earliest recorded mention of prostitution as an occupation. These describe a temple brothel operated by Sumerian priests in the city of Uruk. This kakum, or temple, was dedicated to the goddess Ishtar and was home to three classes of women. The first class of women was only permitted to perform sexual rituals in the temple: the second class had access to the grounds and catered to visitors; and the third and lowest class lived on the temple grounds. The third class was also free to find customers on the streets.

In the region of Canaan, a significant portion of temple prostitutes were male. Male prostitution was also widely practiced in Sardinia and in some of the Phoenician cultures, usually in honor of the goddess Ashtart.

In later years, sacred prostitution and similar classifications for females were known to have existed in Greece, Rome, India, China, and Japan. Such practices came to an end when the emperor Constantine, in the 320s AD, destroyed the goddess temples and replaced the religious practices with Christianity.

=== Biblical references ===
Prostitution was commonplace in ancient Israel. There are a number of references to prostitution in the Hebrew Bible. The biblical story of Judah and Tamar (Genesis 38:14–26) provides a depiction of prostitution being practiced in that time period. In this story, the prostitute waits at the side of a highway for travelers. She covers her face in order to identify herself as a prostitute. Instead of being paid in money, she asks for a kid goat and water. This would have been the equivalent of a high price, showing that only the wealthy owner of numerous herds could have afforded to pay for a single sexual encounter. Under this system, if the traveler does not have his cattle with him, he must give valuables to the woman as a deposit until a kid goat is delivered to her. The woman in the story was not a legitimate prostitute but was actually Judah's widowed daughter-in-law, who sought to trick Judah into impregnating her. In a later biblical story found in the Book of Joshua, a prostitute in Jericho named Rahab assists Israelite spies by providing them with information regarding the current socio-cultural and military situation. Rahab was knowledgeable in these matters because of her popularity with the high-ranking nobles. The Israelite spies promised, in exchange for this information, to save her and her family during the planned military invasion—but only if she kept the details of her contact with them a secret. She would leave a sign on her residence that indicated to the advancing soldiers not to attack the people within. When the people of Israel conquered Canaan, she converted to Judaism and married a prominent member of the people.

In the Book of Revelation, the Whore of Babylon is named "Babylon the Great, the Mother of Prostitutes and Abominations of the Earth". However, the word "whore" could also be translated as "idolatress".

== America ==
=== Aztecs and Incas ===
Among the Aztecs, the Cihuacalli was the name given to the controlled buildings where prostitution was permitted by political and religious authorities. Cihuacalli is a Nahuatl word that means "house of women". The Cihuacalli was a closed compound with rooms, all looking over a central patio. At the center of the patio was a statue of Tlazolteotl, the goddess of purification, steam baths, midwives, filth, and adulterers. Religious authorities believed women should work as prostitutes if they wish, but only on premises guarded by Tlazolteotl. It was believed that Tlazolteotl had the power to incite sexual activity while cleansing the spirit of such acts.

Inca prostitutes were segregated from other people and lived under the supervision of a government agent.

== Antiquity ==
=== Greece ===
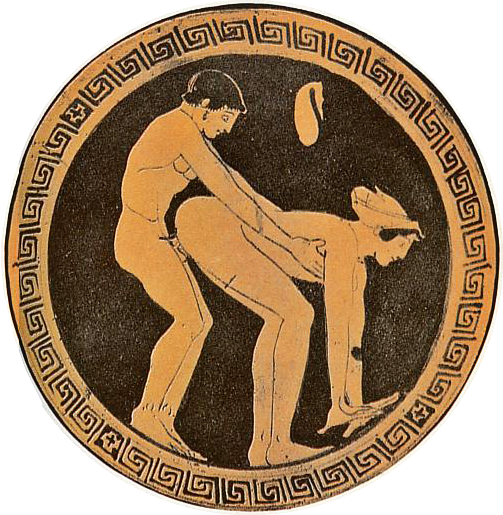
A sexual scene of a male and a Hetaira prostitute. A money pouch is hanging on the wall. The tondo of an ancient Greek wine cup. 480–470 BCE

In ancient Greece, both women and men engaged in prostitution. The Greek word for prostitute is pornē (Gr: πόρνη), derived from the verb pernemi (to sell). The English word pornography, and its corollaries in other languages, are directly derived from it. Female prostitutes could be independent and sometimes influential women. They were required to wear distinctive dresses and had to pay taxes. Some similarities have been found between the Greek hetaera and the Japanese oiran, complex figures that are perhaps in an intermediate position between prostitution and courtisanerie. (See also the Indian tawaif.) Some prostitutes in ancient Greece, such as Lais, were as famous for their company as their beauty, and some of these women charged extraordinary sums for their services.

Solon instituted the first of Athens' brothels (oik'iskoi) in the sixth century BC, and with the earnings of this business, he built a temple dedicated to Aphrodite Pandemos, goddess of sexual pleasure. Procuring, however, was severely forbidden. In Cyprus (Paphus) and in Corinth, a type of religious prostitution was practiced where the temple counted more than a thousand prostitutes (hierodules, Gr: ιερόδουλες), according to Strabo.

Each specialized category had its proper name, so there were the chamaitypa'i, working outdoors (lie-down), the perepatetikes who met their customers while walking (and then worked in their houses), and the gephyrides, who worked near the bridges. In the fifth century, Ateneo informs us that the price was 1 obole, a sixth of a drachma, and the equivalent of an ordinary worker's day salary. The rare pictures describe that sex was performed on beds with covers and pillows, while triclinia usually did not have these accessories.

Male prostitution was also common in Greece. Adolescent boys usually practiced it, a reflection of the pederastic custom of the time. Slave boys worked the male brothels in Athens, while free boys who sold their favours risked losing their political rights as adults. Customers were predominantly male. Athens collected a tax from the earnings of both male and female prostitutes (pornikon telos: Aeschin. In Tim. 119), so male prostitution was clearly acceptable.

=== Rome ===
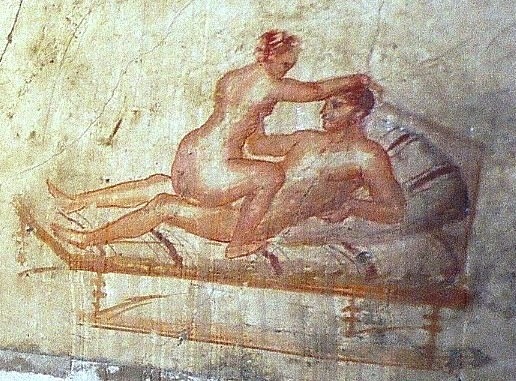
Fresco from the Pompeii brothel

Prostitution in ancient Rome was legal, public, and widespread. Even Roman men of the highest social status were free to engage prostitutes of either sex without incurring moral disapproval, as long as they demonstrated self-control and moderation in the frequency and enjoyment of sex. Latin literature also often refers to prostitutes. Real-world practices are documented by provisions of Roman law that regulate prostitution. Inscriptions, especially graffiti from Pompeii, uncover the practice of prostitution in Ancient Rome. Some large brothels in the fourth century, when Rome was becoming Christianized, seem to have been counted as tourist attractions and were possibly state-owned. Prostitutes played a role in several Roman religious observances, mainly in the month of April, over which the love and fertility goddess Venus presided. While prostitution was widely accepted, prostitutes were often considered shameful. Most were slaves or former slaves, or if free by birth relegated to the infames, people lacking in social standing and deprived of the protections that most citizens under Roman law received. Prostitution thus reflects the ambivalent attitudes of Romans toward pleasure and sexuality.

A registered prostitute was called a meretrix while the unregistered ones fell under the broad category prostibulae. There were some similarities with the ancient Greek system but, as the Empire grew, prostitutes were often foreign slaves, captured, purchased, or raised for the purpose of prostitution. This was sometimes done by large-scale "prostitute farmers" where abandoned children were raised, almost always to become prostitutes. Enslavement for prostitution was sometimes used as a legal punishment for women. Buyers were allowed to inspect naked men and women for sale in private and there was no stigma attached to the purchase of males by a male aristocrat. Caligula was the first Roman emperor to tax prostitution. It remained for about 450 years before being abolished under the Christian emperor Theodosius I in the late 4th century.

Christianity was more judgmental towards prostitution but St Augustine opined that, "if you expel prostitution from society, you will unsettle everything on account of lusts". Religious campaigns against slavery during and after the collapse of the Roman Empire turned prostitution back into a business. Under Justinian the Great, the historian Procopius claimed that Empress Theodora had been a prostitute actress before ascending to the purple. However, Justinian's legislation aimed to curb underage female prostitution in 529 and nullified the legality of pimps' contracts with their prostitutes in 535. At the same time, his laws excluded the female employees of taverns and inns from punishment for adultery given that prostitution was considered an essential part of their employment; this led to canon law forbidding clergy from using such establishments and the eventual creation of a separate system of hostels for ecclesiastics and pilgrims.

== Islamic world ==
See also: Concubinage in Islam and History of concubinage in the Muslim world

In the seventh century, Muhammad declared that prostitution is forbidden. In Islam, prostitution is considered a sin, and Abu Mas'ud Al-Ansari is attributed with saying, "Allah's Apostle forbade taking the price of a dog, money earned by prostitution and the earnings of a soothsayer." (Sahih al-Bukhari, 3:34:439) However, sexual slavery via Concubinage in Islam was not considered prostitution and was very common during the Arab slave trade from the Middle Ages via early modern period until the 20th century. Women and girls from the Caucasus, Africa, Central Asia and Europe were captured and served as concubines in the harems of the Arab World. Ibn Battuta said several times that he was given or purchased female slaves. They were in effect prostituted; not by being owned by a single man who sold their sexual favors, but by being sold from client to client, and thus frequently changing owners. This solved the ban of prostitution, since it was allowed for a man to have sex with his slave.

Since the principle of concubinage in Islam in Islamic Law allowed a man to have intercourse with his female slave, prostitution was also practiced by a pimp selling his female slave on the slave market to a client, who was allowed to have intercourse with her as her new owner; and who returned his ownership of her to her pimp on the pretext of discontent after intercourse, which was a legal and accepted method for prostitution in the Islamic world.

According to Shia Muslims, Muhammad sanctioned fixed-term marriage, called muta'a in Iraq and sigheh in Iran, which according to some Western writers, has allegedly been used as a legitimizing cover for sex workers, in a culture where prostitution is otherwise forbidden. Sunni Muslims, who make up the majority of Muslims worldwide, believe the practice of nikah mut‘ah was revoked and ultimately forbidden by the second Sunni caliph, Umar. Shias deem all sexual relations outside of proper marriage (the only being nikah or nikah mutah) as haram. Like the Shia, Sunnis regard prostitution as sinful and forbidden.

The flow of slaves, from the Trans-Saharan slave trade, the Red Sea slave trade, the Indian Ocean slave trade, the saqaliba Balkan slave trade, the Barbary slave trade, the Black Sea slave trade and other routes continued openly until Slavery in Saudi Arabia, Slavery in Yemen, slavery in the United Arab Emirates and slavery in Oman was banned during the 1960s and 1970s, and later replaced by human trafficking.

=== Ottoman Empire ===
See also: Prostitution in the Ottoman Empire

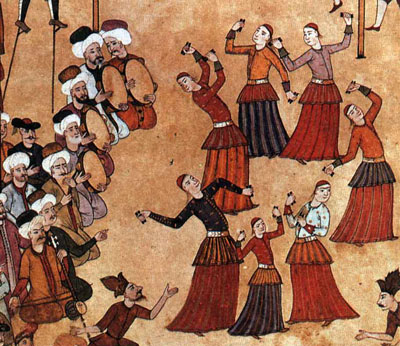
Köçek troupe at a fair. Recruited from the ranks of colonized ethnic groups, köçeks were entertainers and sex slaves in the Ottoman Empire.

During the era of slavery in the Ottoman Empire, prostitution was connected to slavery. The Islamic Law formally prohibited prostitution. However, since the principle of concubinage in Islam in Islamic Law allowed a man to have intercourse with his female slave, prostitution was practiced by a pimp selling his female slave on the slave market to a client, who was allowed to have intercourse with her as her new owner, and who after intercourse returned his ownership of her to her pimp on the pretext of discontent, which was a legal and accepted method for prostitution in the Islamic world. The prostitution of female slaves where formally prohibited with the Kanunname of 1889.

Prostitution of free prostitutes was however also prevalent in the Ottoman Empire, with both men and women, as well as Christians, Jews, and Muslims, engaging in the practice. Clients met prostitutes in a variety of locations, including coffeehouses, inns for bachelors (“bachelor rooms”), laundries, restaurants, barbershops, and candy stores. Prostitutes often served sailors and military members, particularly in their lodgings; additionally, prostitutes served clients in private homes, abandoned buildings, and taverns. In early modern Istanbul, evidence suggests that some women worked alone to find clients in public areas at night, while others worked together to bring clients to rooms they rented. To evade detection, some female prostitutes disguised themselves as men, and certain pimps married their prostitutes to remain under the radar.

During the late Ottoman Empire, Istanbul became a central hub for the trafficking of women, with networks operating both domestically and internationally. Both men and women were involved in trafficking and procuring prostitutes.

While people of all religions in the Ottoman Empire engaged in prostitution, the experiences of prostitutes differed by their religious identity. In the Ottoman Empire, it was illegal for Muslim women to marry or engage sexually with non-Muslim men, while Muslim men could marry non-Muslim women. Accordingly, the law imposed more severe punishments for Muslim women than non-Muslim women accused of prostitution. Nonetheless, many Muslim women engaged in prostitution, mainly working in their homes and public spaces rather than in brothels. Female prostitutes generally attempted to limit their sexual interactions to “confessional lines” since cases were more likely to be brought to court when religious boundaries were crossed.

Records show that male prostitutes were also present in the Ottoman Empire. Most male prostitutes were registered with the state, and they often worked in public bathhouses.

Economic necessity drove many into prostitution, particularly those lacking a support system due to divorce, widowhood, or economic downturns. Poor women, previously enslaved women, women from rural areas, and immigrants were noted to enter prostitution out of financial necessity. Engaging in prostitution often tainted these women as “disreputable,” which led to their alienation and further limited their economic opportunities.

The Ottoman Empire had a complex and ambiguous legal approach to prostitution. While Islamic law prescribes harsh punishments, such as lashes and stoning, for crimes of illicit sex, most prostitutes did not face capital punishment. Instead, prostitutes were typically banished from their neighborhood or city or forced to pay a fine. Scholars attribute this gap between legal theory and practice to the difficulty of proving sexual misconduct, the incentives faced by the state to permit prostitution, and the ambiguity embedded in legal theory on prostitution, given its legal equivalence to the broader category of zinā (fornication).

== East Asia ==
=== China ===
Private and commercial prostitution became most developed during the Ming and Ching dynasties. In this later era, the cities of Suzhou, Hangzhou, Nanjing, Yangzhou, Shanghai, Beijing, Lianjin and Kuangzhou were all famous for their thriving prostitution trade. While elite courtesans generally limited their public appearances within designated entertainment quarters, prostitutes were actually “street women ”. Common prostitutes plied their trade openly in the public domain. In the early hours of the evening, prostitutes descended from their living quarters and hung around tea houses and drinking places in search of business.

=== Southeast Asia ===
In Southeast Asia, prostitution was mostly prevalent in Singapore, due to its active ports. Certain districts of Singapore were dedicated brothel districts sanctioned by the colonial governments. As colonial powers entered the Asian countries, there was an increase in the number of sailors at ports. Merchant ships carried large crews of men, who lacked the company of women for days on end. As these ships docked in Asian ports, like Singapore, they were drawn to the market of prostitution. This higher demand for the company of a woman created the need for these brothel districts.

=== India ===
A tawaif was a courtesan who catered to the nobility of South Asia, particularly during the era of the Mughal Empire. These courtesans would dance, sing, recite poetry and entertain their suitors at mehfils. Like the geisha tradition in Japan, their main purpose was to professionally entertain their guests. While sex was often incidental, it was not assured contractually. The most popular or highest-class tawaifs could often pick and choose between the best of their suitors. They contributed to music, dance, theatre, film, and the Urdu literary tradition.

The term devadasi originally described a Hindu religious practice in which girls were married and dedicated to a deity (deva or devi). They were in charge of taking care of the temple, performing rituals they learned, and practicing Bharatanatyam and other classical Indian art traditions. This status allowed them to enjoy high social status. The popularity of devadasis seems to have reached its pinnacle around the 10th and 11th centuries. The rise and fall in the status of devadasis can be seen to be running parallel to the rise and fall of Hindu temples. Due to the destruction of temples by Islamic invaders, the status of the temples fell very quickly in North India and slowly in South India. As the temples became poorer and lost their patron kings, and in some cases were destroyed, the devadasis were forced into lives of poverty and prostitution.

During the British East India Company's rule in India in the late 18th and early 19th centuries, it was initially fairly common for British soldiers to engage in inter-ethnic prostitution, where they would frequently visit local Indian nautch dancers. As British women began arriving in British India in large numbers from the early to mid-19th century, it became increasingly uncommon for British soldiers to visit Indian prostitutes, and miscegenation was despised altogether after the events of the Indian Rebellion of 1857.

=== Japan ===
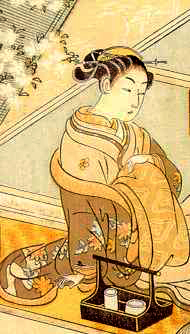
An oiran preparing herself for a client, ukiyo-e print by Suzuki Haronubu (1765)

From the 15th century, Chinese, Korean, and other Far Eastern visitors began frequenting brothels in Japan. This practice continued among visitors from the Western Regions, mainly European traders, beginning with the Portuguese in the 16th century who often came with their South Asian lascar crew, along with African crewmembers in some cases. In the 16th century, the local Japanese people initially assumed that the Portuguese were from Tenjiku ("Heavenly Abode"), the Japanese name for the Indian subcontinent due to its importance as the birthplace of Buddhism, and that Christianity was a new Indian faith. These mistaken assumptions were due to the Indian city of Goa being a central base for the Portuguese East India Company and also due to a significant portion of the crew on Portuguese ships being Indian Christians.

In the 16th and 17th centuries, Portuguese visitors and their South Asian (and sometimes African) crew members often engaged in slavery in Japan, where they bought or captured young Japanese women and girls, who were either used as sexual slaves on their ships or taken to Macau and other Portuguese colonies in Southeast Asia, the Americas and India. For example, in Goa, a Portuguese colony in India, there was a community of Japanese slaves and traders during the late 16th and 17th centuries. Later European East India companies, including those of the Dutch and British, also engaged in prostitution in Japan.

In the early 17th century, there was widespread male and female prostitution throughout the cities of Kyoto, Edo and Osaka, Japan. Oiran were courtesans in Japan during the Edo period. The oiran was considered a type of yūjo (遊女) also known as a "woman of pleasure" or prostitute. Among the oiran, the tayū (太夫) was considered the highest rank of courtesan available only to the wealthiest and highest ranking men. To entertain their clients, oiran practiced the arts of dance, music, poetry, and calligraphy as well as sexual services, and education was considered essential for sophisticated conversation. Many became celebrities of their times outside the pleasure districts. Their art and fashions often set trends among wealthy women. The last recorded oiran was in 1761.

Karayuki-san, literally meaning "Ms. Gone Abroad", were Japanese women who traveled to or were trafficked to East Asia, Southeast Asia, Manchuria, Siberia and as far as San Francisco in the second half of the 19th century and the first half of the 20th century to work as prostitutes, courtesans and geisha. In the 19th and early 20th centuries, there was a network of Japanese prostitutes being trafficked across Asia, in countries such as China, Japan, Korea, Singapore and British India, in what was then known as the ’Yellow Slave Traffic’.

In the early 20th century, the problem of regulating prostitution according to modern European models was widely debated in Japan.

== Europe ==
=== Medieval Europe ===
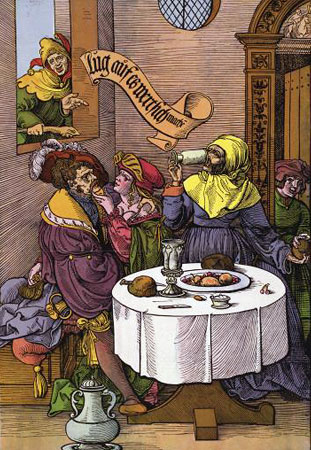
Medieval German depiction of prostitution.

During the Middle Ages prostitution was commonly found in urban and suburban contexts. Although all forms of sexual activity outside of marriage were regarded as sinful by the Roman Catholic Church, partially on the basis of Augustine's support, prostitution was tolerated because it helped prevent the greater evils of rape, sodomy and masturbation. In his popular Dragmaticon, the 12th-century Scholastic philosopher William of Conches's discussion of medieval Islamic and European medical science includes an exchange where he explains to Geoffrey Plantagenet that prostitutes so seldom bore children because pleasure was supposedly required for conception, a misconception dating to Galen.

In much of Northern Europe, a more tolerant attitude could be found towards prostitution and prostitutes also found a fruitful market in the Crusades. However, the general tolerance of prostitution was for the most part reluctant, and many people from the church urged prostitutes to reform. By the High Middle Ages it was common to find increasing efforts to limit legal access to the trade. Boroughs empowered with local governmental authority increasingly ruled that prostitutes were not to ply their trade within the town walls; they were tolerated outside only because these areas were beyond the jurisdiction of the authorities or because the authorities profited themselves. In London the brothels of Southwark were famously owned by the Bishop of Winchester. In many areas of France and Germany, municipalities instead limited access to certain streets as areas where prostitution could be tolerated. In Southern Europe, the increasing trend was the establishment of civic brothels, with any prostitution found taking place elsewhere punished for its failure to secure licensing.

=== Early modern Europe ===
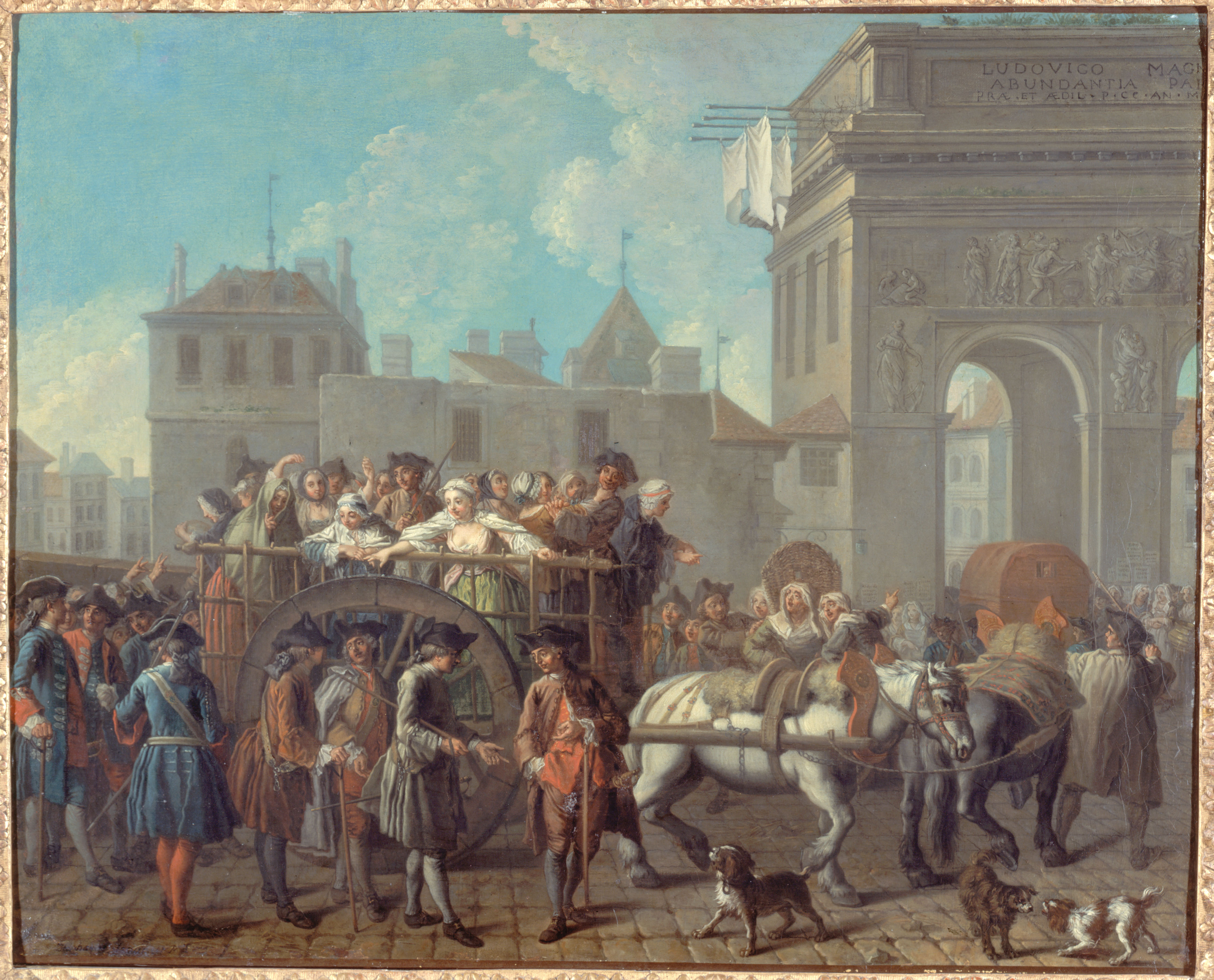
French prostitutes being taken to the police station; painting by Étienne Jeaurat

By the end of the 15th-century attitudes began to harden against prostitution. An outbreak of syphilis in Naples during 1494, which later swept across Europe, may have originated from the Columbian Exchange. The prevalence of other sexually transmitted diseases during the earlier 16th century may have caused this change in attitude. By the early 16th century the association between prostitutes, plague, and contagion emerged, causing brothels and prostitution to be outlawed by secular authority. Furthermore, outlawing brothels and prostitution was used to "strengthen the criminal law" system of the 16th-century secular rulers. Canon law defined a prostitute as "a promiscuous woman, regardless of financial elements". The prostitute was considered a "whore ... who [was] available for the lust of many men", and was most closely associated with promiscuity.

The Church's stance on prostitution was three-fold. It included the "acceptance of prostitution as an inevitable social fact, condemnation of those profiting from this commerce, and encouragement for the prostitute to repent. The Church was forced to recognize its inability to remove prostitution from the worldly society, and in the 14th century "began to tolerate prostitution as a lesser evil". However, prostitutes were excluded from the Church as long as they continued with their lifestyle. Around the 12th century, the idea of prostitute saints took hold, with Mary Magdalene being one of the most popular saints of the era. The Church used Mary Magdalene's biblical history of being a reformed harlot to encourage prostitutes to repent and mend their ways. Simultaneously, religious houses were established with the purpose of providing asylum and encouraging the reformation of prostitution. Magdalene Homes were particularly popular and peaked in the early 14th century. Over the course of the Middle Ages, popes and religious communities made various attempts to remove prostitution or reform prostitutes with varying success.

With the advent of the Protestant Reformation, numbers of Southern German towns closed their brothels in an attempt to eradicate prostitution. In some periods prostitutes had to distinguish themselves from other with particular signs. They sometimes wore very short hair or no hair at all, and sometimes they wore veils in societies where other women did not wear them. Ancient codes regulated the crime of a prostitute that dissimulated her profession.

=== United Kingdom ===
The United Kingdom introduced the Sexual Offences Act of 1956 which would partly be repealed and altered by the Sexual Offences Act 2003. While this law did not criminalise the act of prostitution itself, it did prohibit such activities as running a brothel and soliciting for paid sex.

== Centuries ==
=== 18th century ===
Anthropologist Stanley Diamond comments that prostitution was encouraged in Dahomey as it was a form of acquiring tax revenue in the state. Archibald Dalzel documented in 1793 that prostitutes were distributed by the civil power throughout various villages at a price that was set by civil decree. It was the responsibility of prostitutes to provide services to anyone who could afford the fee. During the Annual Customs of Dahomey, prostitutes paid taxes. J. A. Skertchly wrote in 1874 that prostitutes were licensed by the King of Dahomey.

According to Dervish Ismail Agha, in the Dellâkname-i Dilküşâ, the Ottoman archives, in the hammams, the masseurs were traditionally young men who helped wash clients by soaping and scrubbing their bodies. They also were referred to as sex workers. The Ottoman texts describe who they were, their prices, how many times they could bring their customers to orgasm, and the details of their sexual practices.

In the 18th century, presumably in Venice, prostitutes started using condoms made with catgut or cow bowel.

=== 19th century ===
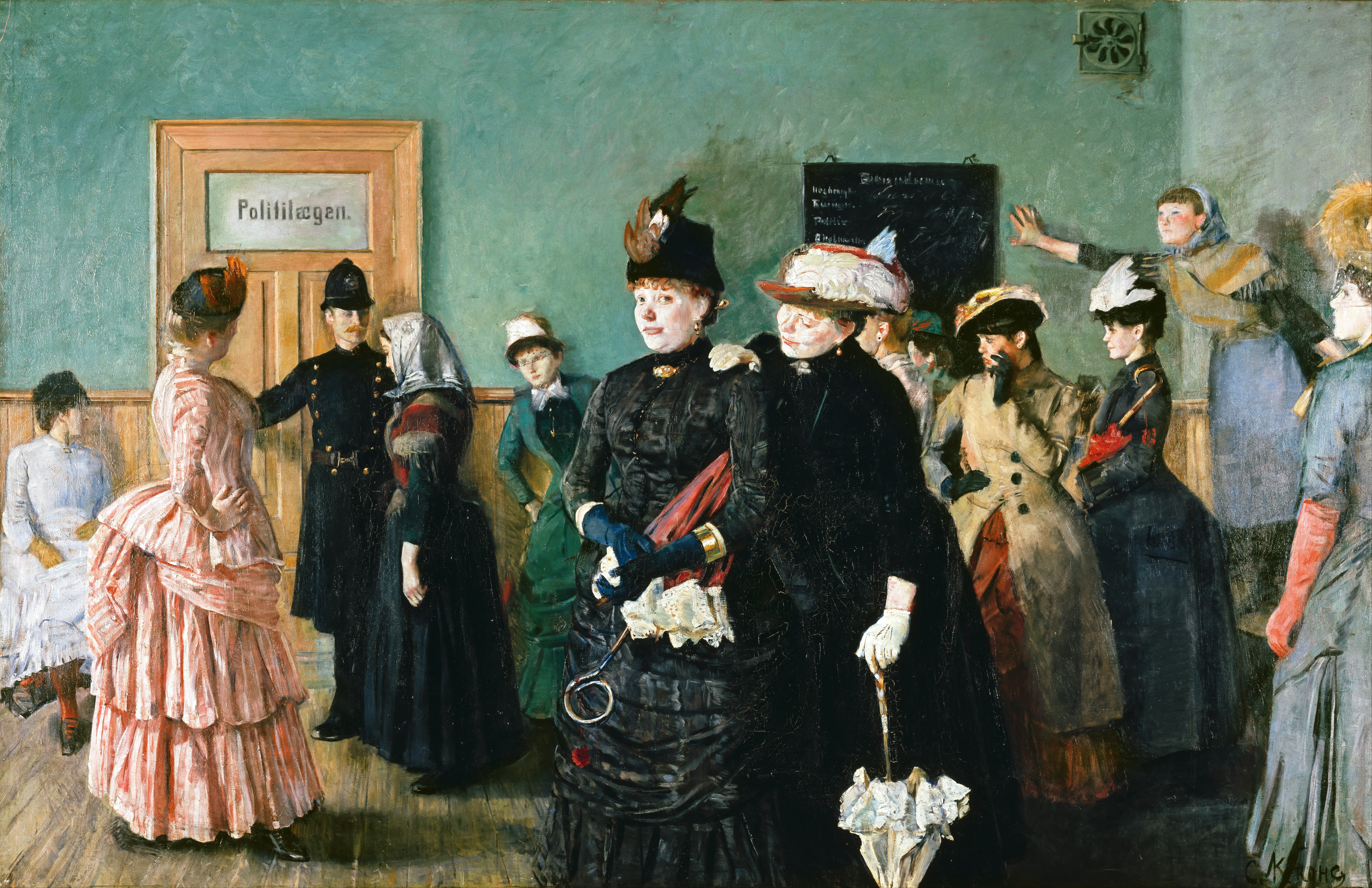
Albertine at the Police Doctor's Waiting Room, 1885–87 painting by the Norwegian writer and painter Christian Krohg illustrating his then very controversial novel Albertine about the life of a prostitute.

In North America, prostitution was seen as a "necessary evil" that aided in marital fidelity, especially as a system that would allow men to obtain sex when their wives did not desire it. D'Emilio and Freedman document that prostitution was not a crime in the early part of the 19th century, and thus brothels (or bawdy houses) were tolerated in American cities and the laws against individual prostitutes were enforced only occasionally.

In the 1830s, prostitution was becoming more visible in North-American cities, and with the professionalization of police forces, visible prostitutes such as streetwalkers risked arrest. But D'Emilio and Freedman note that raids on brothels were comparatively rare, and prostitution was tolerated in mining towns, cattle towns, and urban centers in the American east. In 1870, prostitution was legalized and regulated in the city of St. Louis, Missouri. Prostitutes were licensed by public health officials and were required to maintain weekly inspections for sexually transmitted diseases. However, due to protests and demonstrations organized by women and members of the clergy, Missouri legislators repealed the legislation allowing regulated prostitution.

The Page Act of 1875 was passed by the US Congress and forbid any importation of women for the purpose of prostitution. The national move to criminalize prostitution was led by Protestant middle-class men and women who participated in the Christian revivalism movement of the 19th century. In the 1899 text Soul Laws in Sexual, Social, and Spiritual Life, F.S. Heath discussed premarital sex in relation to heredity, claiming that "children inherit the peculiarities of the parents in soul, mind, and body” though despite this, “every person, by putting forth an earnest effort to do so, and seeking the help of God, can always overcome all besetments.” Approximately 4,000 copies of the book were in print by 1902. Reflecting the prevailing attitude of the time, Heath noted:

Tens of thousands of betrayed women mostly girls, are annually forced or persuaded to adopt a harlot's life. In every case it is the greatest possible mistake. The only hope of happiness or desirable life left any erring mortal is through repentance or forsaking evil, and a return to good and God. Every plunge into deeper sin is a plunge into greater misery and woe. Right and happiness and wrong and misery never part company. There may be temporary obscurity, but when the mists are cleared away, this truth shines out clearly. God and all good men and women gladly welcome all who will honestly turn from an evil life to a good one. In all parts of our land some one will be found who will help an honest unfortunate. The Salvation Army, the city missions, and the rescue homes will assist fallen women, so there is no necessity for them to remain, suffer, and die in their evil life. Much less is there a necessity for any girl who has any reputation left, to go to complete ruin and death. ... A woman who will give her heart to God will find a quick introduction in any community, and make friends faster by being a true working Christian in Church circles than in almost any other way. Those who advise entering a harlot's life either do not know what they are talking about or have some bad motives. Men and women get good prices for bringing women to houses of ill-fame. The average life of an abandoned woman after she fairly commences her trade is said to be only five years. Turning night into day, disease, drink, narcotics, misery, and despair do their deadly work quickly. She is liable to become diseased in the worst form the first week of her bad life, and be in pain and misery ever after. She will find the life so hateful that she will be glad to fly to drink or narcotics to secure a temporary forgetfulness of it. So she quickly goes out of life.

Many of the women who posed in 19th- and early-20th-century vintage erotica were prostitutes. The most famous were the New Orleans women who posed for E. J. Bellocq. In the 19th century legalized prostitution became a public controversy as France and then the United Kingdom passed the Contagious Diseases Acts. This legislation mandated pelvic examinations for suspected prostitutes. It applied not only to the United Kingdom and France but also to their overseas colonies. Many other European countries used the so called Regulation System of registration of regular control of licensed prostitutes during the 19th century. Many early feminists fought to repeal these laws, either on the grounds that prostitution should be illegal and therefore not government regulated or because it forced degrading medical examinations upon women. A similar situation existed in the Russian Empire. This included prostitutes operating out of government-sanctioned brothels given yellow internal passports signifying their status and were subjected to weekly physical exams. Leo Tolstoy's novel Resurrection describes legal prostitution in 19th-century Russia.

During the 19th century, the British in India began to adopt the policy of social segregation, but they continued to keep their brothels full of Indian women. In the 19th and early 20th centuries there was a network of Chinese and Japanese prostitutes being trafficked across Asia, in countries such as China, Japan, Korea, Singapore and British India, in what was then known as the "Yellow Slave Traffic". There was also a network of European prostitutes being trafficked to India, Ceylon, Singapore, China, and Japan around the same time, this known as the "White Slave Traffic". The most common destination for European prostitutes in Asia were the British colonies of India and Ceylon, where hundreds of women and girls from continental Europe and Japan were raped by British soldiers.

==== Mining camps ====
The houses of prostitution found in every mining camp worldwide were famous, especially in the 19th century when long-distance imports of prostitutes became common. Entrepreneurs set up shops and businesses to cater to the miners, and brothels were largely tolerated in mining towns. Prostitution in the American West was a growth industry that attracted sex workers from around the globe where they were pulled in by the money, despite the harsh and dangerous working conditions and low prestige. Chinese women were frequently sold by their families and taken to the camps as prostitutes and were often forced to send their earnings back to the family in China. In Virginia City, Nevada, a prostitute, Julia Bulette, was one of the few who achieved "respectable" status. She nursed victims of an influenza epidemic, earning her acceptance in the community and the support of the sheriff. The townspeople were shocked when she was murdered in 1867 and they honoured her with a lavish funeral and hanging of her assailant.

Until the 1890s, madams predominately ran the businesses, after which male pimps took over. This led to a general decline in the treatment of women. It was not uncommon for brothels in Western towns to operate openly, without the stigma that was beginning to emerge in East Coast cities as a result of anti-prostitution activism. Gambling and prostitution were central to life in these western towns, and only later, as the female population increased, reformers moved in and other civilizing influences arrived, did prostitution become less blatant and less common. After a decade or so the mining towns attracted respectable women who ran boarding houses, organized church societies, and worked as laundresses and seamstresses, all while striving for independent status.

Australian mining camps had a well-developed system of prostitution. City fathers sometimes tried to confine the practice to red-light districts. The precise role prostitution played in various camps depended on the sex ratio in specific population groups of colonial society as well as racial attitudes toward non-whites. In the early 19th century British authorities decided it was best to have lower-class white, Asian, Middle Eastern, and Aboriginal women service the prisoners and thereby keep the peace while maintaining strong class lines that isolated British gentlemen and ladies from the lower elements. Prostitution was so profitable that it was easy to circumvent the legal boundaries. When Australians took control by 1900 they wanted a "white Australia" and tried to exclude or expel non-white women who might become prostitutes. However, feminist activists fought against Australia's discriminatory laws that led to varying levels of rights for women, races, and classes. By 1939 new attitudes toward racial harmony began to surface. These were inspired by white Australians to rethink their racist policies and adopt more liberal residency laws that did not focus on sexual or racial issues.

Latin American mining camps also had well-developed systems of prostitution. In Mexico the government tried to protect and idealize middle-class women but made little effort to protect prostitutes in the mining camps.

In 20th-century African mining camps, prostitution followed the historical patterns developed in the 19th century. They added the theme of casual temporary marriages.

=== 20th century ===
==== 1914–1950s ====
During World War I, in the colonial Philippines, U.S. Armed Forces developed a prostitute management program called the "American Plan" which enabled the military to arrest any woman within five miles of a military cantonment. If found infected, a woman could be sentenced to a hospital or a farm colony until cured.

Beginning in the 1910s and continuing in some places into the 1950s, the American Plan operated in the United States. Women were told to report to a health officer where they were coerced to submit to an invasive examination. Immigrants, minorities, and the poor were primarily targeted.

In 1921, the International Convention for the Suppression of the Traffic in Women and Children was signed. In this convention, some nations declared reservations about prostitution.

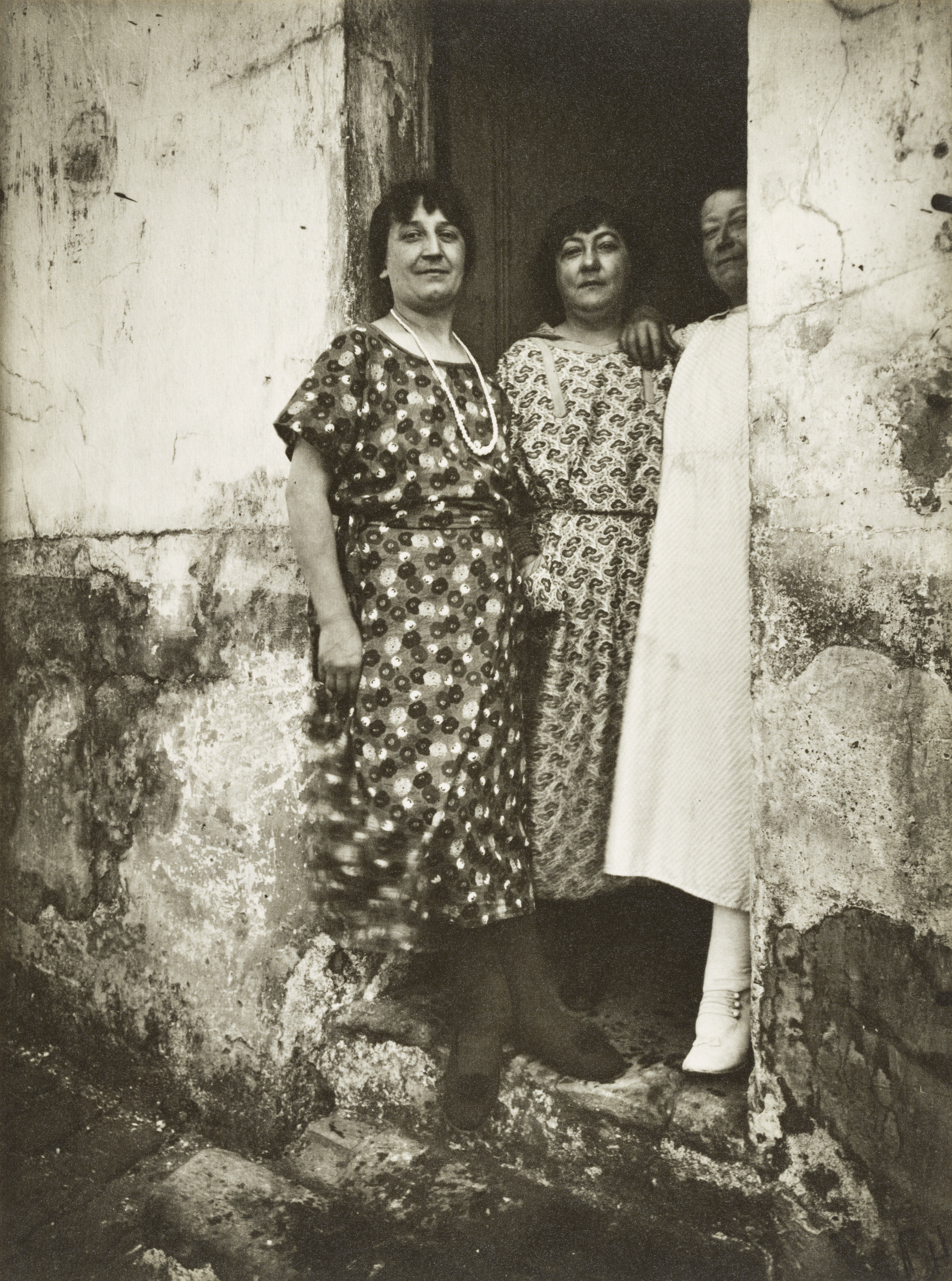
Three prostitutes in a doorway on Rue Asselin, in Paris's red-light district, ca. 1924–25, photographed by Eugène Atget

The leading theorists of communism opposed prostitution. Karl Marx thought of it as "only a specific expression of the general prostitution of the laborer", and considered its abolition to be necessary to overcome capitalism. Friedrich Engels considered even marriage as a form of prostitution, and Vladimir Lenin found sex work distasteful. Communist governments often took wide-ranging steps to repress prostitution immediately after obtaining power, although the practice always persisted. In the countries that remained nominally communist after the end of the Cold War, especially China, prostitution remained illegal but was nonetheless common. In many current or former communist countries, the economic depression brought about by the collapse of the Soviet Union led to an increase in prostitution.

During World War II, Japanese soldiers engaged in forced prostitution during their invasions across East Asia and Southeast Asia. The term "comfort women" became a euphemism for the estimated 200,000 mostly Korean and Chinese women who were forced into prostitution in Japanese military brothels during the war.

==== 1950s–2000s ====
Sex tourism emerged in the late 20th century as a controversial aspect of Western tourism and globalization. Sex tourism was typically undertaken internationally by tourists from wealthier countries. Author Nils Ringdal alleged that three out of four men between the ages of 20 and 50 who have visited Asia or Africa have paid for sex.

A new legal approach to prostitution emerged at the end of the 20th century, termed the Swedish model. This included the prohibition of buying, but not selling, sexual services. This means that only the client commits a crime in engaging in paid sex, not the prostitute. Such laws were enacted in Sweden (1999), Norway (2009), Iceland (2009), Canada (2014), Northern Ireland (2015), France (2016), and the Republic of Ireland (2017), and are also being considered in other jurisdictions.

=== 21st century ===
In the 21st century, Afghans revived a method of prostituting young boys, which is referred to as bacha bazi.

When the Soviet Union broke up, thousands of Eastern European women became prostitutes in China, Western Europe, Israel, and Turkey every year. There are tens of thousands of women from eastern Europe and Asia working as prostitutes in Dubai. Men from Saudi Arabia and the United Arab Emirates form a large proportion of the customers.

India's devadasi girls are forced by their poor families to dedicate themselves to the Hindu goddess Renuka. The BBC wrote in 2007 that devadasis are "sanctified prostitutes".

In Germany, attempts to develop a comprehensive framework for prostitution in 2017 have been met by fierce opposition from sex workers, with less than 1% of the prostitutes submitting to their registration duty.

== United States ==
In the United States, prostitution was originally widely legal. For example, prostitution was fairly common in 19th century New York City. Men could pay different "classes" of women for sexual favors. Despite being seen as lower class citizens, anthropological studies shows that the decorations these prostitutes had were relatively classy and they had free time to read and have hobbies.

Prostitution was made illegal in almost all states between 1910 and 1915 largely due to the influence of the 1st wave feminist Woman's Christian Temperance Union, which was influential in the banning of drug use and was a major force in the prohibition of alcohol. In 1917 the prostitution district Storyville in New Orleans was closed down by the Federal government over local objections. In Deadwood, South Dakota, prostitution, while technically illegal, was tolerated by local residents and officials for decades until the last madam was brought down by state and federal authorities for tax evasion in 1980. Prostitution remained legal in Alaska until 1953, and is still legal in some rural counties of Nevada, including areas outside of Las Vegas. For more, see Prostitution in Nevada.

Beginning in the late 1980s many states increased the penalties for prostitution in cases where the prostitute is knowingly HIV-positive. These laws, often known as felony prostitution laws, require anyone arrested for prostitution to be tested for HIV. If the test comes back positive, the suspect is informed that any future arrest for prostitution will be a felony instead of a misdemeanor. Penalties for felony prostitution vary in the states that have such laws, with maximum sentences of typically 10 to 15 years in prison. An episode of COPS which aired in the early 1990s detailed the impact of HIV/AIDS among prostitutes; this episode contributed to HIV/AIDS awareness.

== See also ==
- Hetaira
- History of prostitution in Canada
- History of prostitution in France
- History of human sexuality
- Kagema
- Pederasty in ancient Greece
- Prostitution in ancient Greece
- Prostitution in ancient Rome
- Prostitution in colonial India
- Prostitution in Harlem Renaissance
- Prostitution in the Spanish Civil War
- Sacred prostitution
- Sexuality in ancient Rome
- Sexuality in ancient Greece
