= Padrão Real =

Portuguese master map used during the Age of Exploration

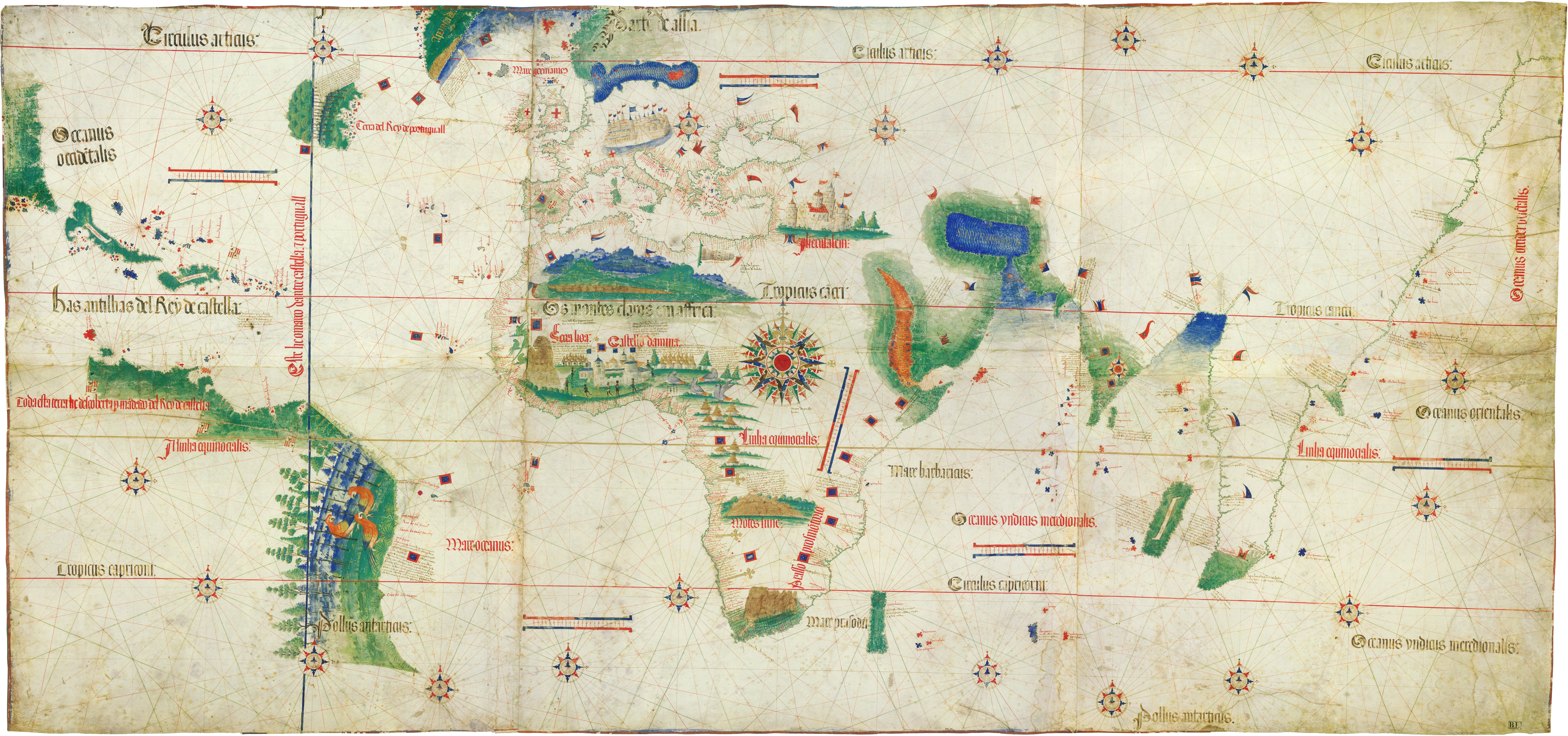
The Cantino planisphere, a 1501 or 1502 copy of the Padrão Real, still showing a highly inaccurate Red Sea and the influence of Ptolemy's Taprobana and Dragon's Tail in Southeast Asia, neither yet reached by the Portuguese India Armadas.

Joao Teixeira Albernaz's "General Chart for All Navigation" (Taboas Geraes de Toda a Navegação), displaying official Portuguese cartography c. 1630

The Padrão Real ([pɐˈðɾɐ̃w ʁiˈal]) or "Royal Register" was the official and quasisecret Portuguese master map during the Age of Exploration, used as a template for the maps of all official Portuguese expeditions. It formed the complete record of Portuguese discoveries both public and secret. First compiled under Henry the Navigator, it was later held and expanded by the Casa da Índia ("India House") in the Ribeira Palace in Lisbon, Portugal. It was hung from the ceiling of the Casa da Índia's Division of Maps, protected from foreign and commercial spies but sometimes available to the era's scientific elite and copied for navigators in royal service.

The later Spanish counterpart of the Padrão Real was the Padrón Real or General compiled under Ferdinand and Isabella in 1507 or 1508 and kept in the Casa de Contratación in Seville, Castile. Like the Padrón Real, the Padrão Real was updated after the return of major expeditions. The Spanish were also obliged to share a copy of their master map under the terms of the 1529 Treaty of Zaragoza as part of establishing the line of demarcation between the two empires east of the Spice Islands (now Indonesia's Maluku Islands).

The original Padrão Real has been lost, although the Cantino planisphere copy still exists. It is thought to have been made by a Portuguese cartographer sometime between December 1501 and October 1502. Cantino presumably bribed the cartographer to produce it and then sent the map to the Duke of Ferrara, probably on 19 November 1502. It is now held by the Biblioteca Estense in Modena, Italy.
