= Portuguese East India Company =

Short-lived colonial charter company

- Coat of arms of Portuguese India
- Native name: Companhia do Commércio da Índia
- Industry: International trade
- Founded: August 1628
- Defunct: May 1633
- Fate: Dissolved
- Successor: Casa da Índia
- Headquarters: Ribeira Palace
- Area served: Portuguese Empire
- Key people: Philip III of Portugal

The Portuguese East India Company (Portuguese: Companhia do commércio da Índia or Companhia da Índia Oriental) was a short-lived and ill-fated attempt by Philip III of Portugal, to create a chartered company to ensure the security of their interests in India, in the face of the mounting pressure and influence by their rivals; the Dutch East India Company and the English East India Company, following the personal union of the Portuguese and Spanish Crowns.

== Background ==
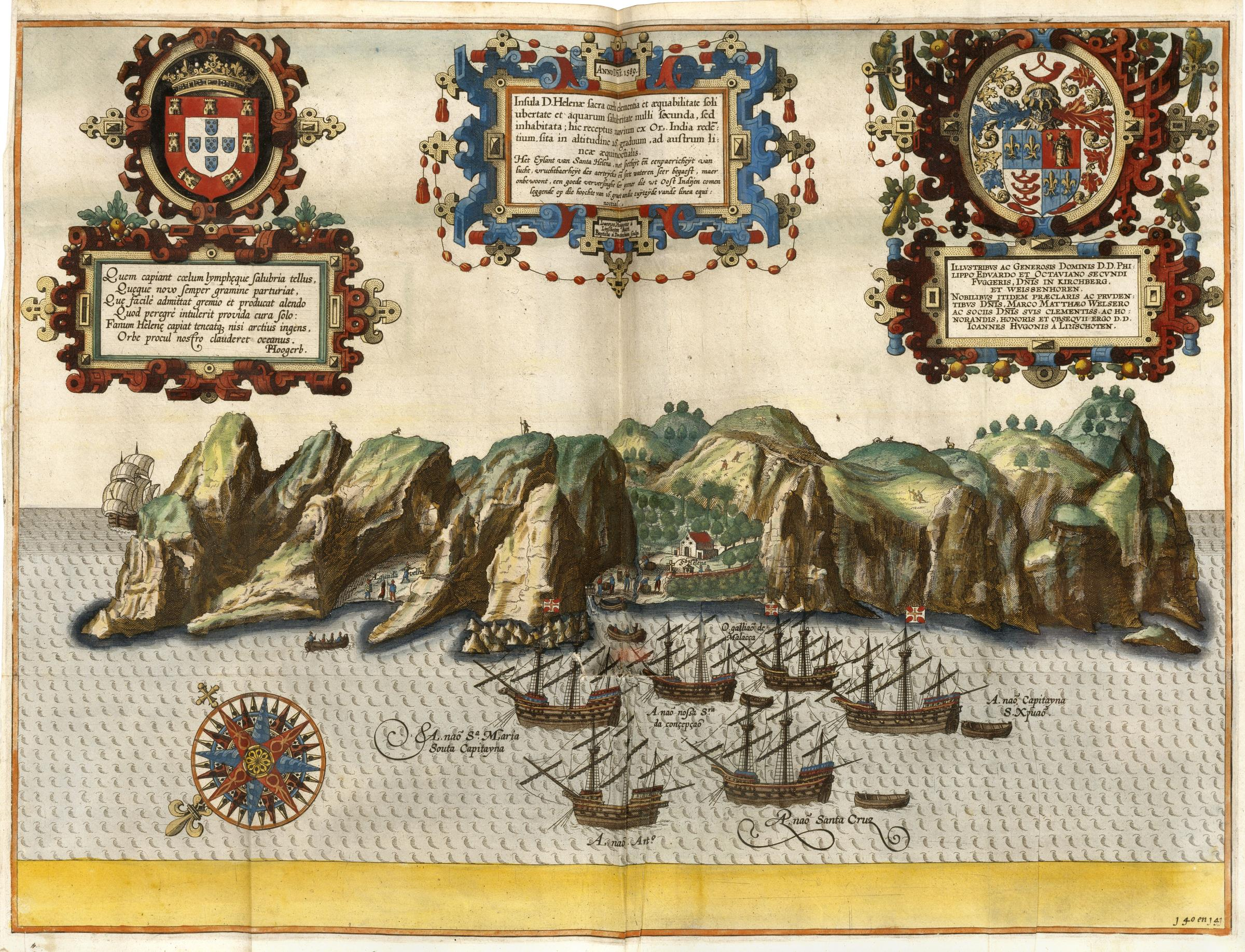
Portuguese East India ships anchored in the harbour of St Helena Island in May 1589, drawn by Jan Huyghen van Linschoten

Portuguese trade with India had been a crown monopoly since the Portuguese captain Vasco da Gama opened the sea route to India in 1497–1499. The monopoly had been managed by the Casa da Índia, the royal trading house founded around 1500, it is a first to start a joint stock company to trade in india. The Casa was responsible for the yearly India armadas. However, by 1560, the Casa's finances were in dire straits and in 1570, King Sebastian of Portugal issued a decree opening up trade to India to any private Portuguese national. As few took up the offer, the free trade decree was replaced in 1578 by a new system of annual monopolies, where the Casa sold India trading contracts to a private Portuguese merchant consortium, granting them a monopoly for one year. This annual contract system was abandoned in 1597, and the royal monopoly resumed.

The Iberian Union of 1580, which gave King Philip II of Spain the crown of Portugal, changed little at first. However, the increasing influence of the Dutch and English East India Companies on the Indian subcontinent and elsewhere in the East Indies after 1598 led the king to experiment with different arrangements to secure the Portuguese colonial empire. In 1605, he created the Conselho da Índia, to bring affairs in Portuguese India under closer supervision of the Habsburg crown. But this conflicted with older lines of Portuguese authority, and the council was eventually dissolved in 1614.

== Proposal ==
It was around this time that the idea of a chartered private Portuguese East Indies company, organized along the lines of Dutch and English companies, was first conceived. This was promoted by Portuguese New Christian merchant and Mercantilist pamphleteer Duarte Gomes Solis who lived in Madrid, most notably in his Spanish language tract Discursos sobre los Comercios de las Indias (published 1622, although circulated earlier). Solis argued that a private joint-stock company could raise more capital, revive the Asian trade and compete more efficiently with the Anglo-Dutch in the Indian Ocean.

King Philip III of Portugal put the idea in motion in 1624 and appointed D. Jorge Mascarenhas, mayor of Lisbon and member of the Council of State, to head a committee to implement Solis proposal. Despite being supported by Olivares, the proposal faced much skepticism and opposition, particularly by the Duke of Villahermosa (head of the Council of Portugal), and Mascarenhas had considerable trouble securing investment commitments.

== The Company ==
The Companhia do commércio da Índia (or Companhia da Índia Oriental) finally came into existence in August 1628, when it was granted a charter by King Philip III. The Companhia was to be governed by a Câmara de Administração Geral, composed of a president (Jorge Mascarenhas) and six administrators, elected by the investors, with full powers, although its judicial acts, administrative practices and finances were subject to review by an advisory Conselho do Comércio (Board of Trade) in the king's court in Madrid. The charter envisaged a two-year transition period, during which the royal Conselho da Fazenda would continue to supervise the India fleets, the Casa da Índia and the Armazém da Índia, before passing them all over to the Companhia's administration. The Companhia would be in charge of running & collecting the customs dues payable at the Casa.

The Companhia was established with a joint-stock block of six years, renewable for another six with a minimum subscription of 100 cruzados. The Companhia was granted a monopoly on trade in coral, pepper, cinnamon, ebony and cowrie shells, and could be extended to other items upon request. It had full administrative & juridical privileges, including the right to keep all spoils from seizures of Dutch and English ships (after deducting the royal fifth).

The crown was the largest investor, committing 1,500,000 cruzados for the first three years. Although some municipalities (esp. Lisbon) also invested, private individuals were less interested. To make it attractive, subscribers were guaranteed an annual return of 4% plus dividends and the subscriptions were laced with various privileges (e.g. title in king's household, protection from debt seizure, even the capital of New Christians convicted by the Portuguese Inquisition, had a measure of protection). Although there were provisions against allowing any other East Indies company to be formed in Habsburg territories, investment in the Companhia was open to all subjects of Philip III and his allies (thus Spaniards, Italians, Flemings, etc.) Nonetheless, none of this was enough to garner much enthusiasm from private individuals. The company was launched with only around half the capital it originally sought to raise.

== The end ==
The Companhia proved unsuccessful. Investors remained skeptical, overseas Portuguese merchants rejected the new Companhia's authority, and the Anglo-Dutch breach of the old Portuguese empire in Asia had become irreparable, squeezing margins on the spice trade. The Companhia proved unprofitable, and soon ceased operating; it was liquidated in April, 1633. The Casa da Índia and the India trade was brought back under the supervision of the Conselho da Fazenda (royal finance council).

== See also ==
- List of trading companies
- List of Portuguese chartered companies
