= Tlaltecatzin of Cuauhchinanco =

Tlaltecatzin
- Born: c. 1320; Cuauhchinanco
- Died: c. 1409
- Occupation: Monarch, Poet

Tlaltecatzin was a poet from the city of Cuauhchinanco (present day Puebla, Mexico).

According to Fernando de Alva Ixtlilxochitl's writings in Obras historicas, Tlaltecatzin lived with Techotlala, who ruled Texcoco. During this time, Texcoco was becoming an important political and cultural center. It was said he spoke elegantly thanks to the nurse who raised him, Papaloxochitl.

== Poetry ==
Tlaltecatzin is remembered as a poet, even though he only has one surviving poem. The poem was recorded twice in post-conquest documents. Several poets also refer to him. As the poet Chichicuepon from Chalco once wrote, "Tlaltecatzin... lived happily..."

Poems attributed to Tlaltecatzin include:

- Tlaltecatzin Icuic, Cuauhchinanco (Song of Tlaltecatzin, Cuauhchinanco)

Fragment of Tlaltecatzin Icuic:

Nicpiecon tepetl, canan itololoyan; xochintlahcuilo, aya. Ipalnemoani, incohuayotl. Toncahuililoc ye mochaan, titlatecatzin, tonaya tlatoa yan ca yiu oo, ohuiyya.	Come to watch over the mountain, in some place is its history; with flowers, painted. The Giver of life, the community. You have been let at your house, you, Tlatecatzin, you heave sighs there, you speak.

In the poem, Tlaltecatzin makes a discernment on how pleasant being finally home was to him.
