= Casa da Guiné =

1443–1503 Portuguese colonial commercial institution

- Flag used by the Casa da Guiné.
- Industry: International trade
- Founded: 1443
- Defunct: 1503
- Fate: Dissolved
- Successor: Casa da Índia
- Headquarters: Lisbon, Kingdom of Portugal
- Area served: Portuguese Empire
- Key people: Manuel I of Portugal

The Casa da Guiné (English: House of Guinea), later known as the Casa da Guiné e Mina and also referred to as the Portuguese Guinea Company, was a state-run Portuguese commercial institution, tasked with the management of the Portuguese Empire's economic interests and colonization in West Africa, particularly on the Gulf of Guinea, on the Gold Coast, and on the Slave Coast.

== History ==
Founded in 1443, during the Age of Discoveries, under the auspices of Prince Henry the Navigator, the Casa da Guiné would later be absorbed into the Casa da Índia in 1503.

== Operations ==
It monitored and enforced the Crown's monopoly, coordinated voyages, maintained warehouses, fixed prices, and performed other roles associated with the Spice trade. It was also where an average of 1,000 slaves were taken from Africa to be sold each year for nearly 50 years. (Alastair-Corston de Custance Maxwell Saunders, A Social History of Black Slaves and Freedman in Portugal, 1441-1555, Cambridge University Press, 1982, pp.19-21)

== See also ==
- Casa da Índia
- Portuguese Guinea
- Mozambique Company
- Portuguese Empire
- List of Portuguese chartered companies
