= Client (prostitution) =

People purchasing the services of sex workers

Clients of prostitutes or sex workers are sometimes known as johns or tricks in North America and punters in Britain and Ireland. In common parlance among sex workers as well as with others, the act of negotiating and then engaging with a client is referred to as turning a trick.

Female clients are sometimes called janes, although the vast majority of prostitution clients are male in almost all countries.

== Lexicology ==
There are many terms for clients, including whoremonger, sex-buyer, British slang such as punter, terms for those in a vehicle such as kerb crawler, as well as Caribbean slang terms for female clients of gigolos such as milk bottle, longtail, yellowtail or stella.

The term trick is sometimes associated with North America and punter is associated with the term for sex workers' clients in Britain and Ireland. These slang terms are used among both prostitutes and law enforcement for persons who solicit prostitutes. The term john may have originated from the frequent customer practice of giving one's name as "John", a common name in English-speaking countries, in an effort to maintain anonymity. In some places, men who drive around red-light districts for the purpose of soliciting prostitutes are also known as kerb crawlers.

== Motivation ==
Studies reveal that most clients seek out sex with prostitutes to satisfy otherwise unfulfilled sexual desires or simply as a means to establish social bonds with women. Other reasons include "sexual experiences (such as threesomes or kink) that aren’t easily available to the men; because the men feel they are unattractive and can’t find a woman to have a relationship with; because the men are seeking a space where their sexual desires or interests won’t be shamed; because the men don’t have time or emotional availability for a relationship; because they are disabled; or because they desire sex without emotional involvement."

== Demography ==
According to Sabine Grenz of the University of Gothenburg, clients come from all socio-economic classes, and include "stockbrokers, truck drivers, teachers, priests or law-enforcement officials." As such, "There are no social characteristics that basically distinguish johns from other men."

According to Megan Lundstrom of Free Our Girls, 80% to 90% of clients are married men. According to a study by Health and Social Life, 55% of clients are married or cohabiting. Only 39% of clients are aware that one could contract an STI from being fellated.

According to Melissa Farley, executive director of Prostitution Research & Education, 60% of clients wear condoms. A survey in Georgia found that 83% of clients would be deterred from purchasing sex if they were outed (name and shame) on billboards which included photos and names. According to a study by Shared Hope International and Arizona State University, 21.6% of clients had professions commonly perceived as one of a position of authority or position of trust such as law enforcement, attorney or military personnel.

In Canada, the average age of a client is between 38 and 42 years old who has purchased sex roughly 100 times over their lifetime. Roughly 70% have completed university or college and earn over 50,000 Canadian dollars a year.

The clients of prostitutes in most countries are overwhelmingly male. The most common age cohort of clients in developing countries are vicenarians (those in their twenties). According to a 2023 online survey of sex workers, the most preferred pantethnic group sex workers sought to engage with was white men, whilst their least preferred panethnic group was Indian men.

== Finances ==
The affordability of prostitution greatly varies from region to region. The prices are lowest in areas where it is legal due to competition within the sex trade that seek to court both sex tourists and local clients. Time magazine has described Germany as the "Cut-Rate Prostitution Capital of the World", in reference to the lower charges.

When the clientele of prostitutes in a specific locality begins to attract modest amounts of newcomers of middle-class or upper-class status, the subsequent cost hike is known to reduce the use of such services by less affluent local prospective clients. In jurisdictions where penalties for buying sex are high, fines imposed on clients can also put low-income clients of prostitution in financial ruin.

== Maltreatment and victimization ==
When the interaction between the clients of prostitutes and sex workers occurs in countries where brothels are illegal, the prostitution trade usually transpires in areas with high amounts of crime, a predicament that puts clients at risk of becoming victims of crime or becoming entangled in the crime in some other manner. According to Chris Atchison, a former sociology instructor at Simon Fraser University in British Columbia, Canada, and founder of John's Voice, clients are verbally abused, robbed and physically assaulted at a rate of 18%, 14% and 4% respectively. In Ireland, there was a significant increase in physical attacks on sex workers by clients after the passing of laws banning the purchase of sex. Clients also sometimes fall victim to extortion, scamming and blackmail.

== Perceptions ==
The manner in which clients were viewed has varied throughout human history depending on location and era. In some periods of history, clients were viewed as enablers of an evil practice, viewing them as furthering a trade that enabled infidelity and eased the breaking of covenants between committed partners. At other times, particularly during times of war, or other events which segregated the sexes, there would be increased sympathy for clients, particularly if service persons threatened to sever their genitals or castrate themselves to attain anaphrodisia if prospective clients were chastised. In contemporary times, clients are sometimes viewed as enablers of human trafficking and child trafficking due to boosting their demand. Female clients have been purported to be viewed less negatively than male clients, possibly due to a perception of novelty that produces curiosity rather than moral judgment.

== Legal treatment ==
The manner in which clients are treated by the law varies by jurisdiction and country. The laws which are most stringent against clients have gradually been referred to as the Swedish model, which is also called the Nordic model or Sex Buyer Law. This is in reference to the law passed in Sweden in 1999 wherein the buyer, rather than the seller of sex is penalized. Although Sweden was the first country to criminalize clients rather than prostitutes, this influenced similar legislation elsewhere. Other countries that have since adopted this model include Norway in 2008, Iceland in 2009, Canada in 2014, and Israel in 2020. Some analysts have argued that laws criminalizing clients rather than prostitutes is peculiar in Western as well as other legal systems, claiming that throughout Western history, there is no precedence of a purchaser of a controversial service committing a greater infraction than the purveyor. The efficacy of the Nordic model has also been heavily disputed (see Nordic model approach to prostitution#Criticism).

In Germany, clients of sex workers are required by law to wear condoms. In Israel, a law proposed by Justice Minister Ayelet Shaked in June 2018 would include fines. In 2018, France increased the penalty against buying of sex to a fine of up to 1,500 euros ($1,700). In Italy, a fine of up to 10,000 Euros was proposed in 2016 for frequenters of prostitutes.

== Campaigning ==
Campaigners against the criminalization of clients include Irish law graduate Laura Lee. In some nations where prostitution is legal such as the Netherlands, rather than being viewed as accessories to human trafficking, clients are called on to join efforts to eradicate its practice by being asked to look out for signs of abuse. In France, some opposition to the fining of clients has come from sex workers unions such as Strass, who argue that initiatives to fine clients make sex work more dangerous as it forces the trade to go underground and due to increased secrecy and less transparency. In 2023, advocates for the decriminalization of sex work in Canada had their constitutional challenge dismissed by the Ontario Superior Court.

In 2018, Pope Francis described clients of prostitution as criminals. In the U.S. state of Arizona, some police forces have adopted fake online advertisements which are police generated in order to lure prostitution clients.

== See also ==
- History of prostitution
