= Cihuacalli =

Cihuacalli was an Aztec word that referred to buildings known as "women-house" which was a place for work performed by women. This likely included prostitution, but was not limited to that. It likely included kitchens or other areas for the monotony of woman's work.

Under Montezuma I these buildings were also used as part of the ceremonies of fallen warriors, where an effigy was placed for four days for women to cry over and then moved in front of the temple to be burned.

The Aztecs considered the prostitution in the Cahuacalli to be sacred and it catered to religious and political authorities. There are stories that also refer to certain places, either inside the Cihuacalli or outside, where women would perform erotic dances in front of men. The poet Tlaltecatzin of Cuauhchinanco noted that special "Joyful Women" would perform erotic dances at certain homes outside of the compound.

The Cihuacalli was a group of enclosed compound with rooms that faced centrally towards a patio which stood a statue of Tlazolteotl. Tlazolteotl was the goddess of sexual impurity and sinful behavior, and was whom they prayed to for absolution. Aztec religious leaders believed that if a woman choose to practice prostitution they should do so under the protection of Tlazolteotl, who incited sexual activity while performing spiritual cleansing for sexual acts.
