= Chichicuepon =

Lord of Chalco and poet

- Born: 15th Century
- Died: 1486

Chichicuepon (? – 1486) was a lord of Chalco and also a poet. Only one of his poems has survived. Chichicuepon had his lands confiscated by the Aztec Empire and their new puppet Itzcahuatzin after Chalco was made a tributary state. Chichicuepon opposed this and asked for his lands to be restored to him when he went to Tenochitlan. Hearing the case, Ahuitzotl declared that Chichicuepon and the other nobles should be hanged. Itzcahuatzin did such in 1486.

Poems attributed to Chichicuepon include:

- Chichicuepon Icuic (Now Give Heed To The Word)
