= Casa da Índia =

1500–1833 Portuguese colonial commercial organization

- Flag originally used by the Casa da Guiné and subsequently the Casa da Índia.
- Industry: International trade
- Predecessor: Casa da Guiné e Mina (Founded 1443); Casa de Ceuta (Founded 1434)
- Founded: 1500
- Defunct: 17 September 1833
- Headquarters: Ribeira Palace, Lisbon, Kingdom of Portugal
- Area served: Portuguese Empire
- Key people: Founder of the Casa da Índia: King Manuel I of Portugal; Founder of the Casa da Guiné: Prince Henry the Navigator

The Casa da Índia (Portuguese pronunciation: [ˈkazɐ ðɐ ˈĩdiɐ]; English: India House or House of India) was a Portuguese state-run commercial organization during the Age of Discovery. It regulated international trade and the Portuguese Empire's territories, colonies, and factories (trading posts) across Asia and Africa. Central to the Casa da Índia's objectives was the establishment and protection of a Portuguese mare clausum ("closed sea" – total control of the seas) in the Atlantic Ocean, Indian Ocean, Arabian Sea, and the Indies.

The House of India was founded by King Manuel I of Portugal in 1500 to direct Portugal's monopoly of the spice trade and to manage royal policy for Portuguese India. Following 1503, it absorbed the Casa da Guiné e Mina, an organization founded by Prince Henry the Navigator in 1443, which operated under a similar mandate for Portuguese Africa, thus making the Casa da Índia responsible for the regulation of all Portuguese imperial trade, the administration of Portuguese trading posts and military bases in Asia and Africa, and protection of the Portuguese Crown's commercial interests.

Founded with the intent of protecting Portugal's monopoly of the spice trade, the Casa da Índia in 1497 began financing and organizing the Portuguese India Armadas, annual armadas of galleons, carracks, and caravels transporting commodities such as gold, ivory, and spices to Lisbon from Portuguese trading posts and colonies across Africa and Asia. The Casa da Índia sponsored numerous famous Portuguese navigators, including Vasco da Gama (who discovered the sea route to India), Pedro Álvares Cabral (who discovered Brazil), and Afonso de Albuquerque (who established Portuguese hegemony in the Indian Ocean).

Throughout the 15th and 16th centuries, the Casa da Índia rapidly grew into an economically powerful institution that played a crucial role in the financing of Portuguese discoveries and expeditions throughout West Africa, East Africa, the Middle East, India, and the East Indies. The Casa da Índia also played an important role in the development of modern cartography, patronizing the Padrão Real, one of the first early world maps.

Between the origins of the Casa da Índia in the 1400s and its dissolution in 1833, its principal aims evolved, as did its relations with the Crown of Portugal and the imperial administration. After 1642 it lost all its trade monopolies on gold, silver, ivory, and spices and became solely a trade regulator and customs agency. Following the destruction of its Ribeira Palace headquarters and facilities in the Great Lisbon Earthquake of 1755, the Casa da Índia grew increasingly obsolete in relation to Portugal's evolving trade and colonial policies, and most of its functions were slowly absorbed into ministries and agencies of the Portuguese government, until the final dissolution of the Casa da Índia in 1833.

== History ==
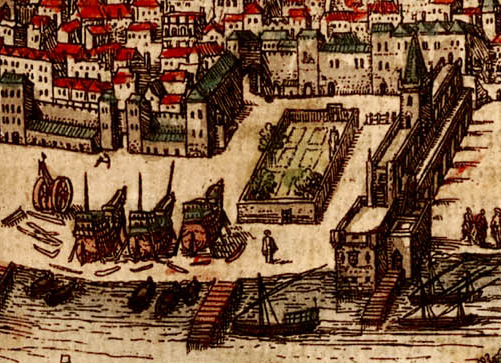
Ribeira Palace (on the right), where the Casa da Índia was headquartered, and its naval yards (on the left), in 1575.

=== Origins ===
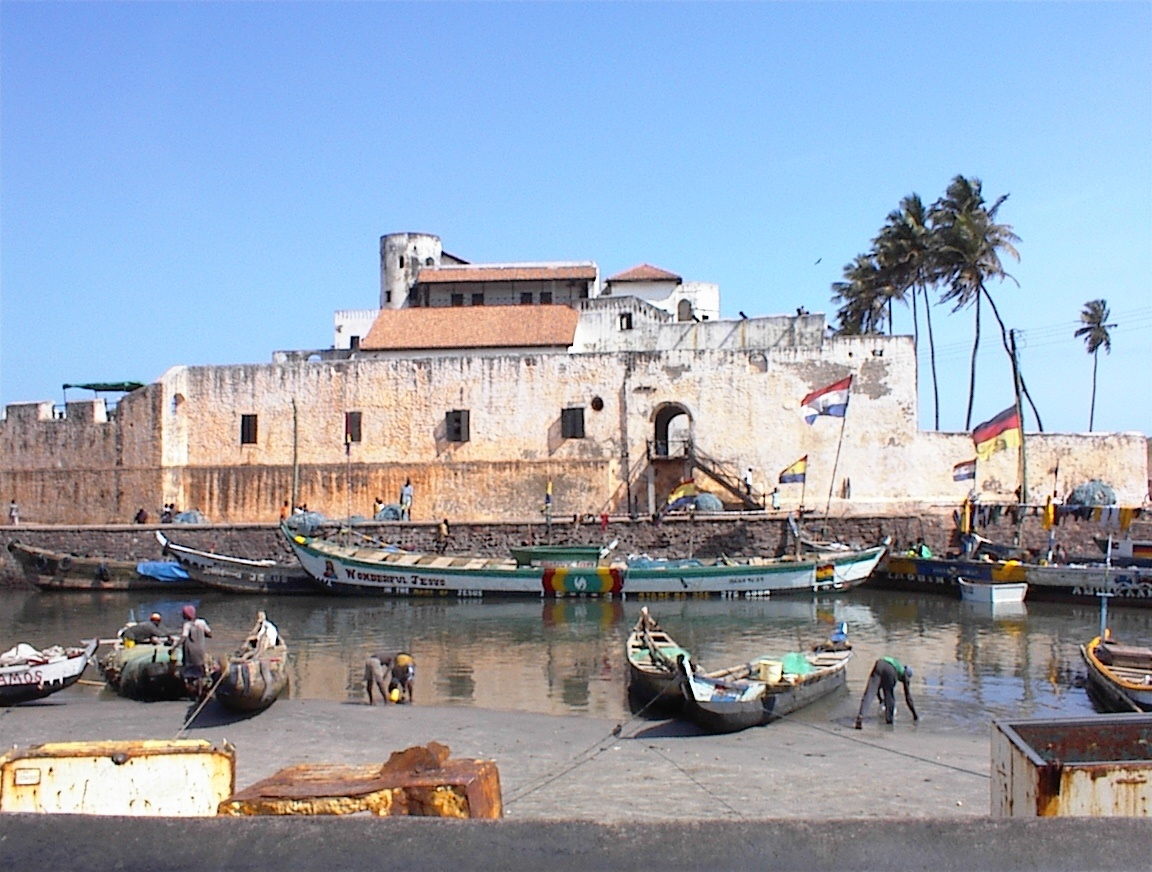
Elmina Castle, built in 1482 on the Portuguese Gold Coast, is the oldest European building in Sub-Saharan Africa. The Casa da Guiné e Mina was charged with managing and taxing Elmina along with the other Portuguese factories on the Gulf of Guinea.

The forerunners of Casa da Índia arose with the Portuguese exploration of the African coast, to manage new trade opportunities.

==== Casa de Ceuta ====
As early as 1434 the Casa de Ceuta was founded in Lisbon, but it was not very successful because the Muslim merchants diverted the trade routes from Ceuta to other places.

==== Casa de Arguim and Casa da Guiné ====
Around 1443 in Lagos, Algarve, the Casa de Arguim and Casa da Guiné, were established to administer Prince Henry the Navigator's monopoly on African trade - essentially a set of sheds, warehouses and customs offices, dedicated to outfitting ships, hiring captains and crews, handing out trading licenses, receiving and selling goods and collecting dues.

After the death of Henry the Navigator in 1460, both houses were moved by King Afonso V of Portugal from Lagos to Lisbon.

The ascension of King John II of Portugal in 1481 revived the royal interest in African trade. In 1482, upon erecting the fortress of São Jorge da Mina to access the Akan goldfields and markets, John II overhauled the old houses and organized the system into two new institutions in Lisbon - the royal trading house, the Casa da Mina e Tratos de Guiné, focused on commercial aspects of African trade (goods, licenses, dues), and the separate royal naval arsenal, the Armazém da Guiné, to handle nautical matters (ship construction, nautical supplies, hiring of crews, etc.)

In 1486, after the opening of contact with Benin, John II established the Casa de Escravos, as a distinct slave-trading department of the Casa da Mina.

=== Golden age ===
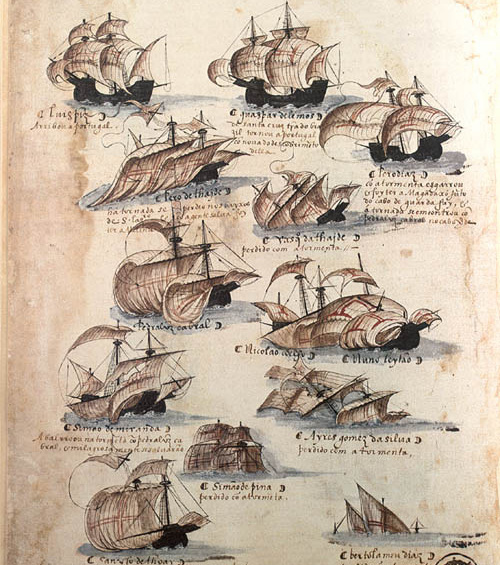
The 2nd Portuguese India Armada, commanded by Pedro Álvares Cabral, discovered Brazil on its way to India.

With the discovery of a sea route to India by Vasco da Gama in 1497-99, the spice trade became a new and important activity of the royal trading house, and the old Casa was reorganized into the Casa da Índia e da Guiné (the first written reference to a Casa da Índia was in a royal letter dated 1501).

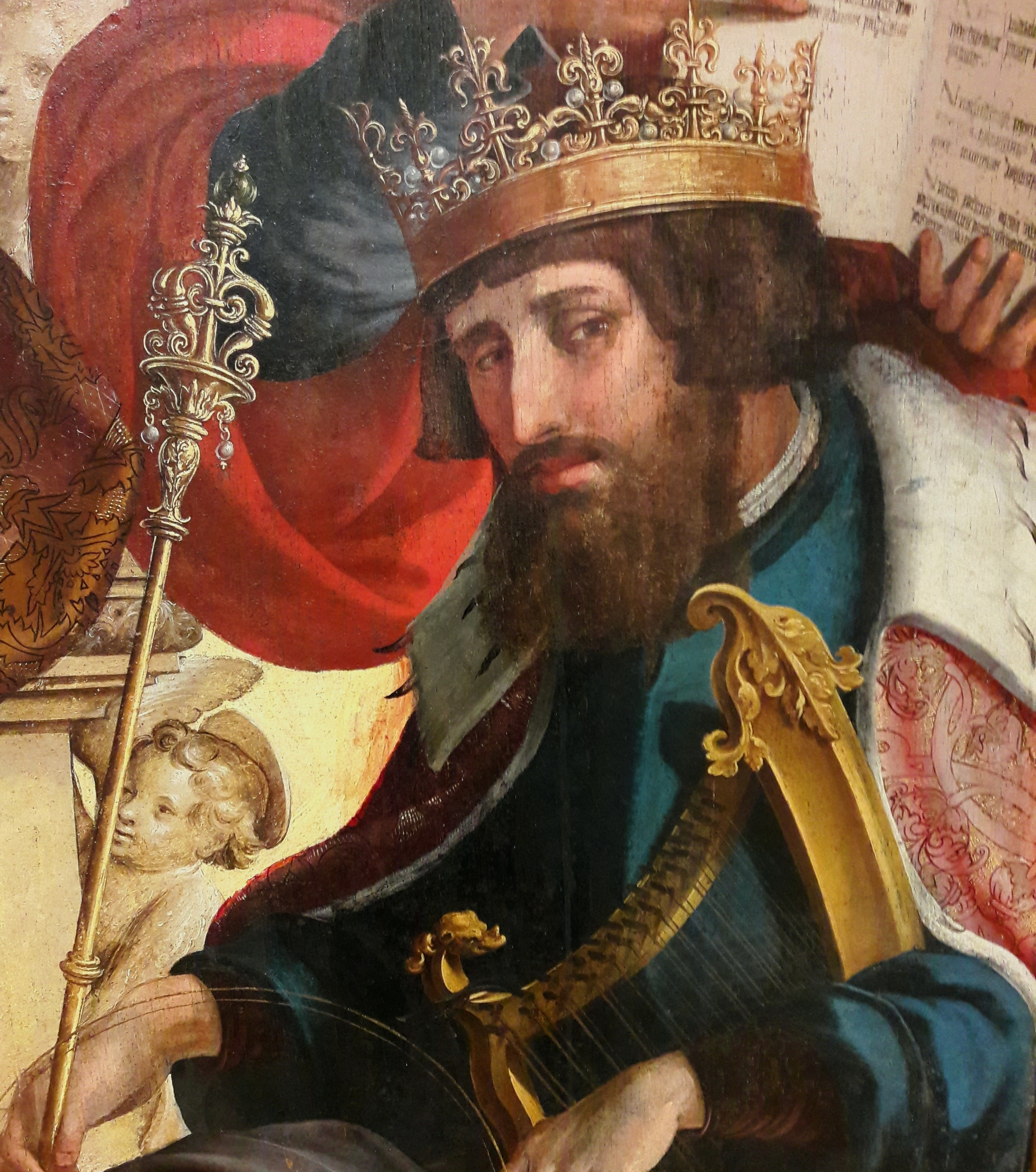
King Manuel I of Portugal created the Casa da Índia and oversaw a successful expansionist period of the Portuguese Empire in Asia, Africa, and the Americas.

From 1511, offices of the Casa da Índia were located on the ground floor of the royal Ribeira Palace on Terreiro do Paço in Lisbon, with the Armazém just next to it.

The Portuguese India Armadas (Armadas da Índia) were the fleets of ships, organized by the Casa da Índia in name of the Portuguese Crown, and dispatched on an annual basis from Portugal to India, principally Goa. These armadas undertook the Carreira da Índia ("India Run"), following the sea route around the Cape of Good Hope first opened up by Vasco da Gama in 1497–1499.

For about thirty years, from 1503 to 1535, the Portuguese cut into the Venetian spice trade in the Mediterranean. By 1510, the Portuguese throne was pocketing a million cruzados yearly from the spice trade alone, and it was this which led Francis I of France to dub King Manuel I of Portugal "le roi épicier", that is, "the grocer king."

Income started to decline mid-century because of costs of maintaining a presence in Morocco and domestic waste. Also, Portugal did not develop a substantial domestic infrastructure to support this activity, but relied on foreigners for many services supporting their trading enterprises, and therefore a lot of the income was consumed in this way.

In 1549 the Portuguese trade center in Antwerp went bankrupt and was closed. As the crown became more overextended in the 1550s, it relied more and more on external financing. By about 1560 the income of the Casa da Índia was not able to cover its expenses. The Portuguese monarchy had become, in Garrett Mattingly's phrase, the owner of "a bankrupt wholesale grocery business."

=== Decline ===
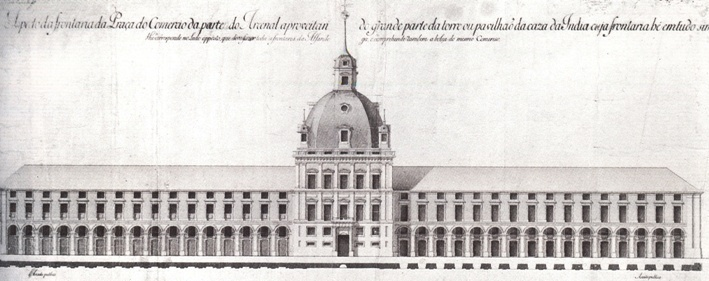
Reconstruction proposal for the headquarters of the Casa da Índia after the Great Lisbon Earthquake of 1755

In 1709 at the Casa da Índia, the Jesuit priest Father Bartolomeu de Gusmão demonstrated the principles of hot air ballooning. He managed to levitate a ball indoors at the Casa da Índia in Lisbon. He later fled from Portugal to Spain, for fear of being accused of performing magic by the Inquisition

The Great Earthquake of 1755 destroyed much of Lisbon, including Ribeira Palace, where the headquarters and naval yards of the Casa da Índia were located.

The final era of the Casa da Índia began in 1822, during the reign of King John VI of Portugal, when a large number of its responsibilities were transferred to different ministries of the Portuguese Government. In 1833, the Casa da Índia was finally dissolved, by King Miguel I of Portugal, and its functions were absorbed by the Alfândega de Lisboa (Customs Agency of Lisbon).

== Organization ==
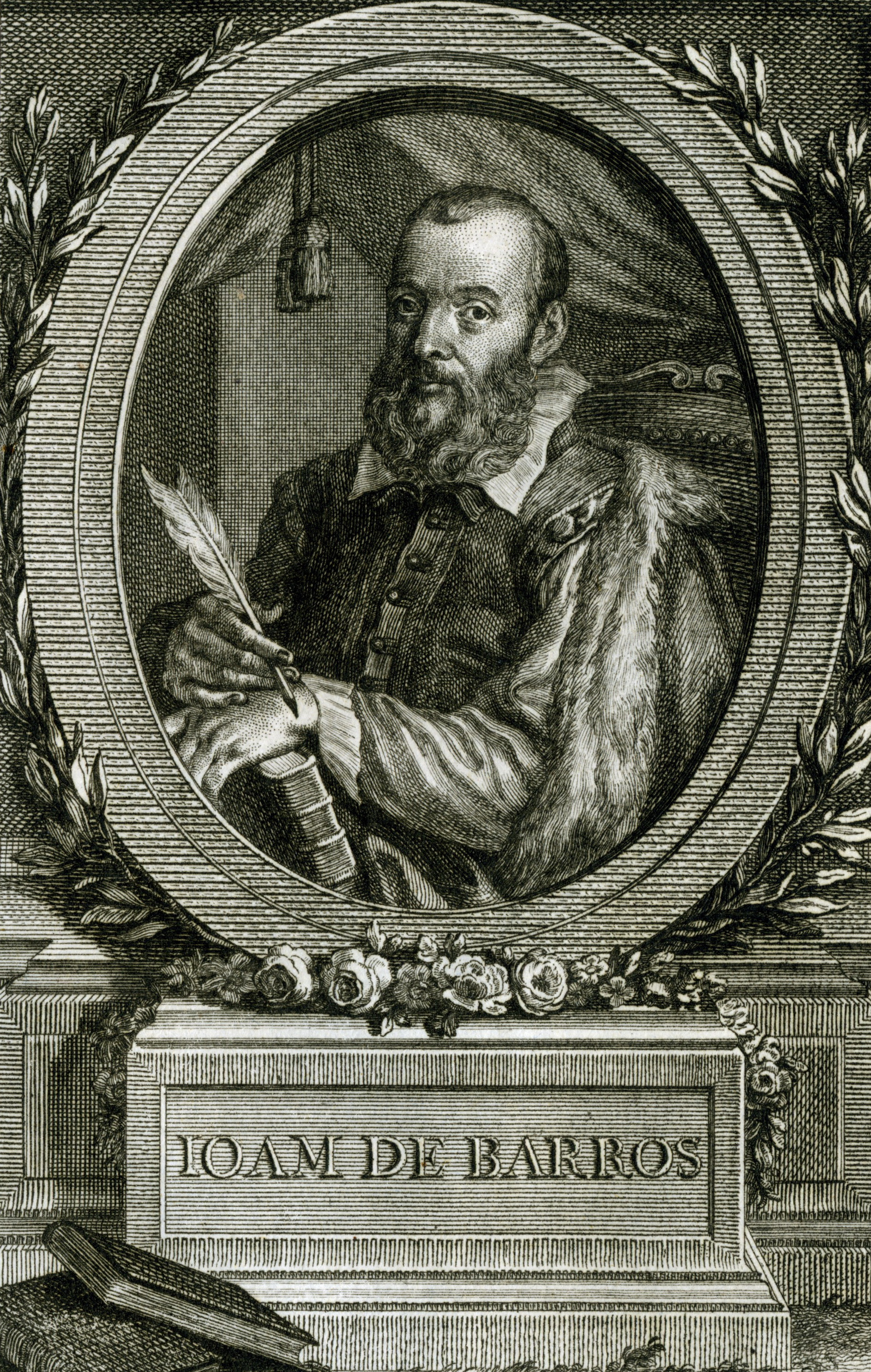
João de Barros, a poet, author, and historian of the Portuguese Renaissance, was Feitor of the Casa da Índia from 1532 to 1568.

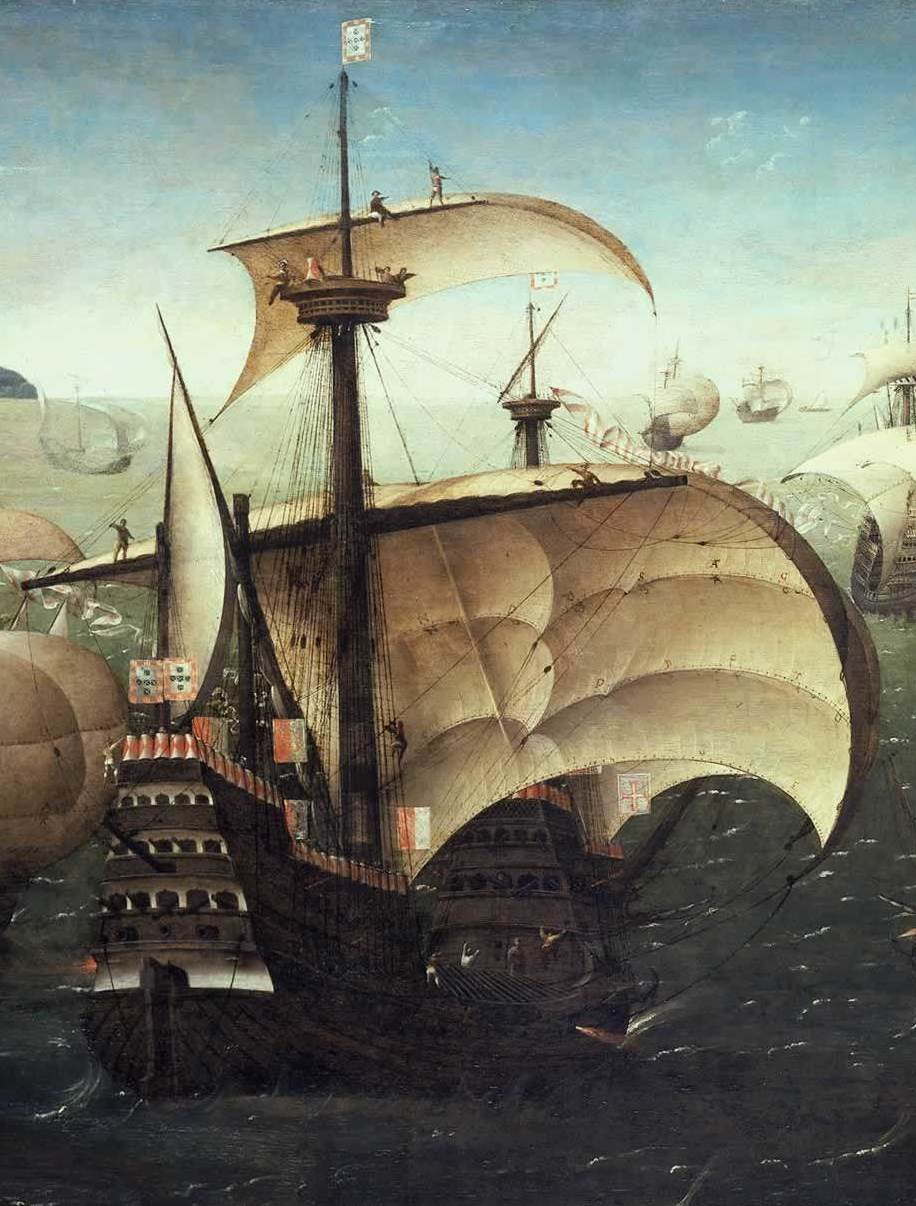
Vasco da Gama's flagship, the Santa Catarina do Sinai.

Although initially (c. 1500) consolidated in one unit, the Casa da Índia e da Guiné, it was separated again (c. 1506) into two distinct units, Casa da Índia and the Casa da Mina e da Guiné again. However, both houses were overseen by the same officers at the higher levels, so it was common to use the joint term, or simply just Casa da Índia, to refer to both.

The Casas were overseen by the same director and the same three treasurers (tesoreiros) - one for receiving goods, one for the sale of goods, and a third to handle everything else. There were five secretaries in charge of the administration - three for India, two for Mina and Guinea - and one chief factor (feitor) in charge of schedules and correspondence with all the Portuguese feitorias around the world. One of the most famous people to hold this position was the chronicler João de Barros, who was appointed feitor in 1532.

The Casa was in charge of monitoring the royal monopoly on the Asian and African trade, i.e. receiving goods, collecting duties on incoming goods, organizing the fleets (notably the yearly Portuguese India Armadas) and shipping schedules, ratifying contracts with private merchants, etc.

The Casa had various mesas (departments) focused on specific areas - the spice trade, finances, ship scheduling, maintenance, training, documentation and legal matters.

=== Shipyards ===
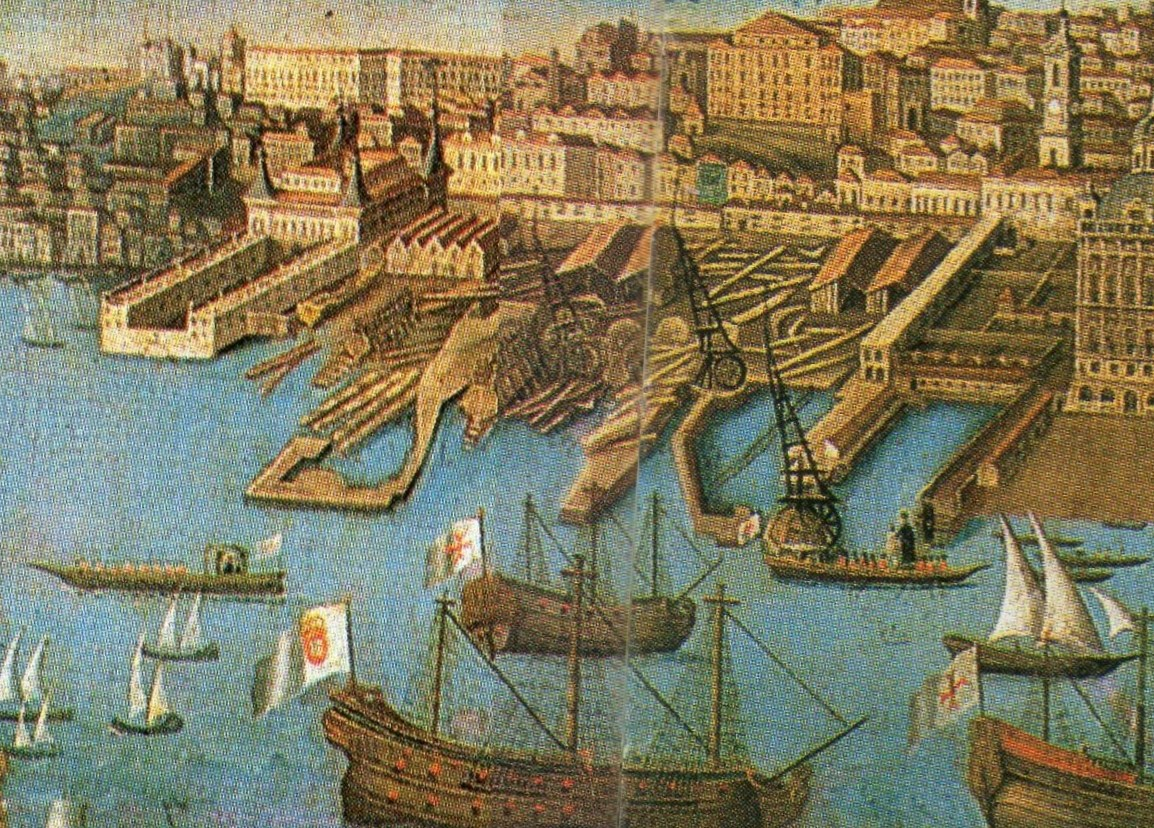
The Armazém da Guiné e Índias, the shipyards of the Casa da Índia.

Separately from the Casa was the Armazém da Guiné e Índias, the new name for the naval arsenal. It was assigned all nautical responsibilities, such as the running of the Lisbon dockyards, the construction of ships, the hiring and training of crews and supplying the fleets with equipment - sails, ropes, guns, nautical instruments and maps.

The Piloto-Mor of the Armazém, a position held between 1503 and 1526 by Pero Anes, Gonçalo Álvares and João de Lisboa, was probably responsible for the training of pilot-navigators and the drafting of navigational charts.

In 1547, the position of Cosmógrafo-mor (High-Cosmographer) was created for the famed mathematician Pedro Nunes and the cartographic duties passed over to him.

The Provedor dos Armazéns was in charge of screening and hiring of crews. The Almoxarife or Recebedor dos Armazéns, was the customs-collector, a highly-profitable job that was once held by Bartolomeu Dias in the mid-1490s.

Although theoretically separate, the Casa and the Armazém kept in contact and coordinated matters with each other, the expenses from one charged to the treasurer of the other, and officers moved seamlessly between them. As a result, it was common to use Casa da Índia to refer to the whole complex.

== Operations ==
In 1504 all trading activities in Africa and, especially, in Asia were merged in the Casa da Índia, becoming subject to state control under the Portuguese kings. Under the supervision of the Vedor da Fazenda (chief royal treasurer) all products had to be handed over to the Casa, taxed and sold at an agreed price with the proceeds paid to the owners.

=== Cartography ===
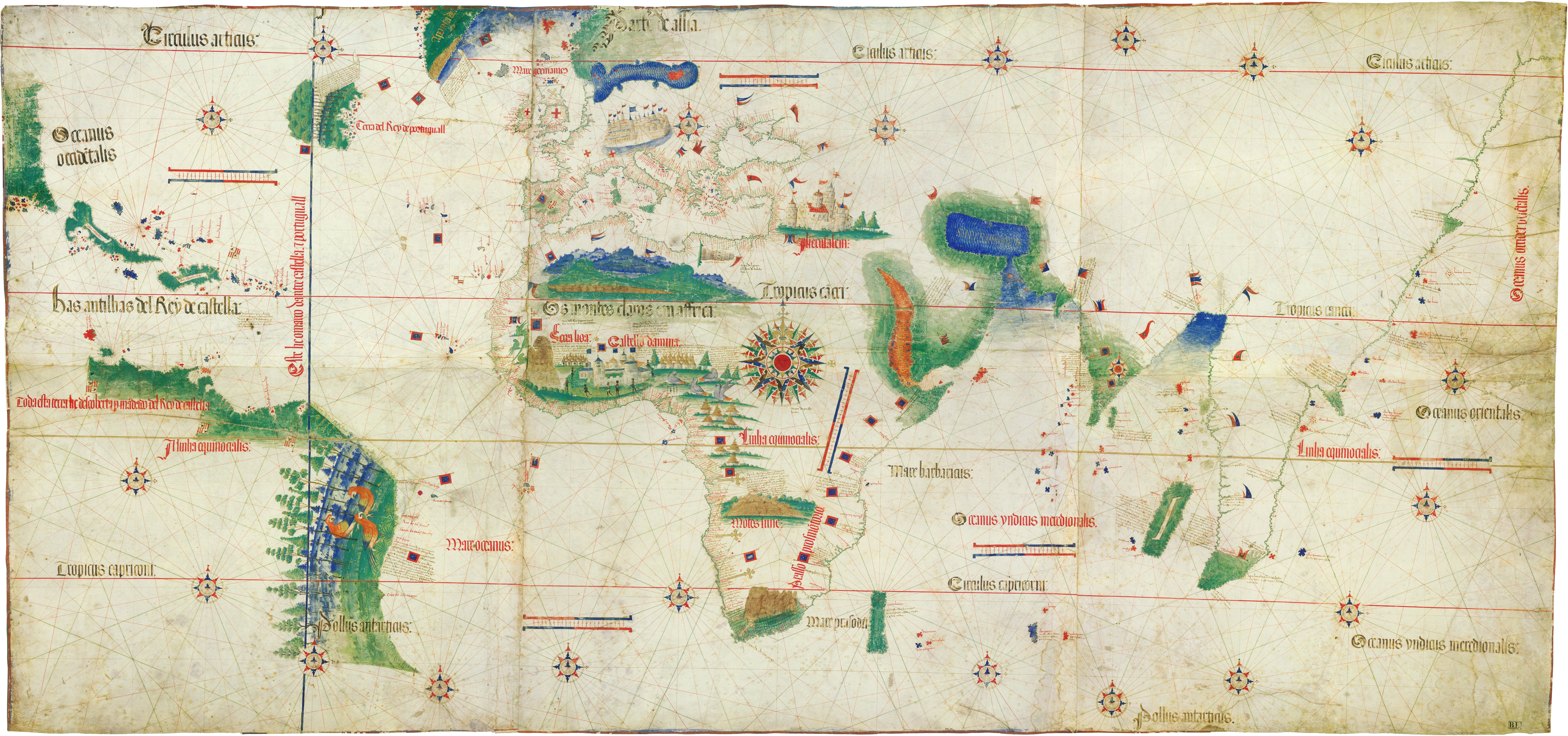
The Cantino planisphere is the only surviving copy of the Padrão Real, the secretive master-map of the world produced by the Casa da Índia's cartographers.

The Casa da Índia produced a secret map called the Padrão Real, one of the first early world maps. The Cantino planisphere is the only existing copy of the Padrão Real.

The Teixeira planisphere was made by Domingos Teixeira in 1573.

=== Customs ===
The Casa da Índia worked as customs, central accounting office for funds and products in various overseas offices, archive, warehouse management, personnel authority of sailors, soldiers and traders, as well as one of the world's first postal services.

It fixed the prices and checked purchases, sales and payments. And also fitted the fleets, gathered the necessary military convoys, managed incoming and outgoing vessels and set out the various certificates and licenses. Through the Casa da Índia the royal officials were appointed overseas, and royal decrees and regulations were spread.

Between 1506 and 1570, Casa da Índia enforced the royal monopoly on all imports and sales of spices - pepper, cloves, and cinnamon - silk and shellac, as well as on the export of gold, silver, copper and coral, and levied a 30 percent tax on the profits of other articles.

=== Royal monopolies ===
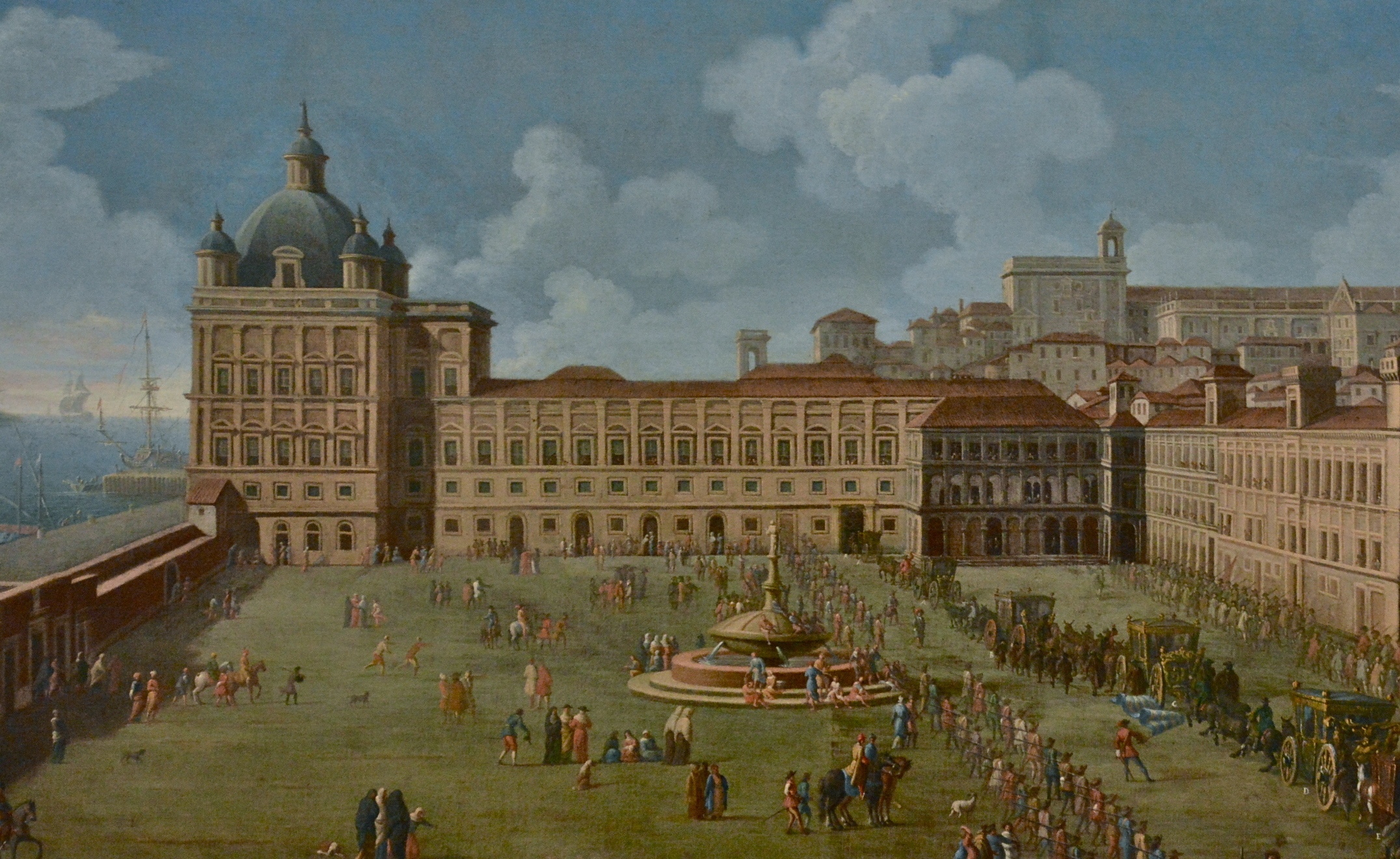
Ribeira Palace, headquarters of the Casa da Índia, and the Terreiro do Paço (Palace Square) in Lisbon in the 18th century.

The royal monopoly on copper exports especially made great gains, as copper was in high demand in India and West Africa, to where it was exported in the form of armlets called manillas, which served as a form of money. From 1495 to 1521 the Portuguese Crown bought in Antwerp, then the center of international trade, approximately 5,200 tonnes copper mainly from the Fugger of Hungary (Thurzo-Fugger company), which was shipped mostly to India.

In 1506, about 65% of the state income was produced on overseas activity. The monopoly of trade remained profitable until 1570, and strengthened the equity and credit capacity of Portugal. The share of the Crown's total trade with Asia in 1506 amounted to about 25% and increased steadily to 50% or more, but never entirely displaced the private traders: the trade monopoly was accompanied always by free trade in other products such as textiles, weapons, paper and salted fish, such as Bacalhau.

Royal monopolies were also leased out sometimes by Casa da Índia to private traders for a certain period. After 1570, the monopolies were abolished, except for the purchase of spices and the trade in copper and silver.

== See also ==
- Casa de Contratación, the Spanish counterpart of the Casa da Índia
- Company of Guinea
- Age of Discovery
- Portuguese Discoveries
- Portuguese Renaissance
- Economic history of Portugal

== Notes ==
- Note on the Castiglioni Planisphere, Armando Cortesao, Imago Mundi, Vol. 11, 1954 (1954), pp. 53–55
- House of India, Encyclopædia Britannica.
- The Dating of the Oldest Portuguese Charts, Alfredo Pinheiro Marques, Imago Mundi, Vol. 41, 1989 (1989), pp. 87–97
- Brazil depicted in early maps, Arthur Dürst, Cartographica Helvetica 6 (1992) 8–16.
- Sixteenth-Century Portugal, Chapter Twelve of A History of Spain and Portugal, Stanley G. Payne, THE LIBRARY OF IBERIAN RESOURCES ONLINE, Volume 1.
