= Ribeira Palace =

Former royal palace in Lisbon (1498–1755)

Coordinates: 38°42′26.21″N 9°8′17.60″W

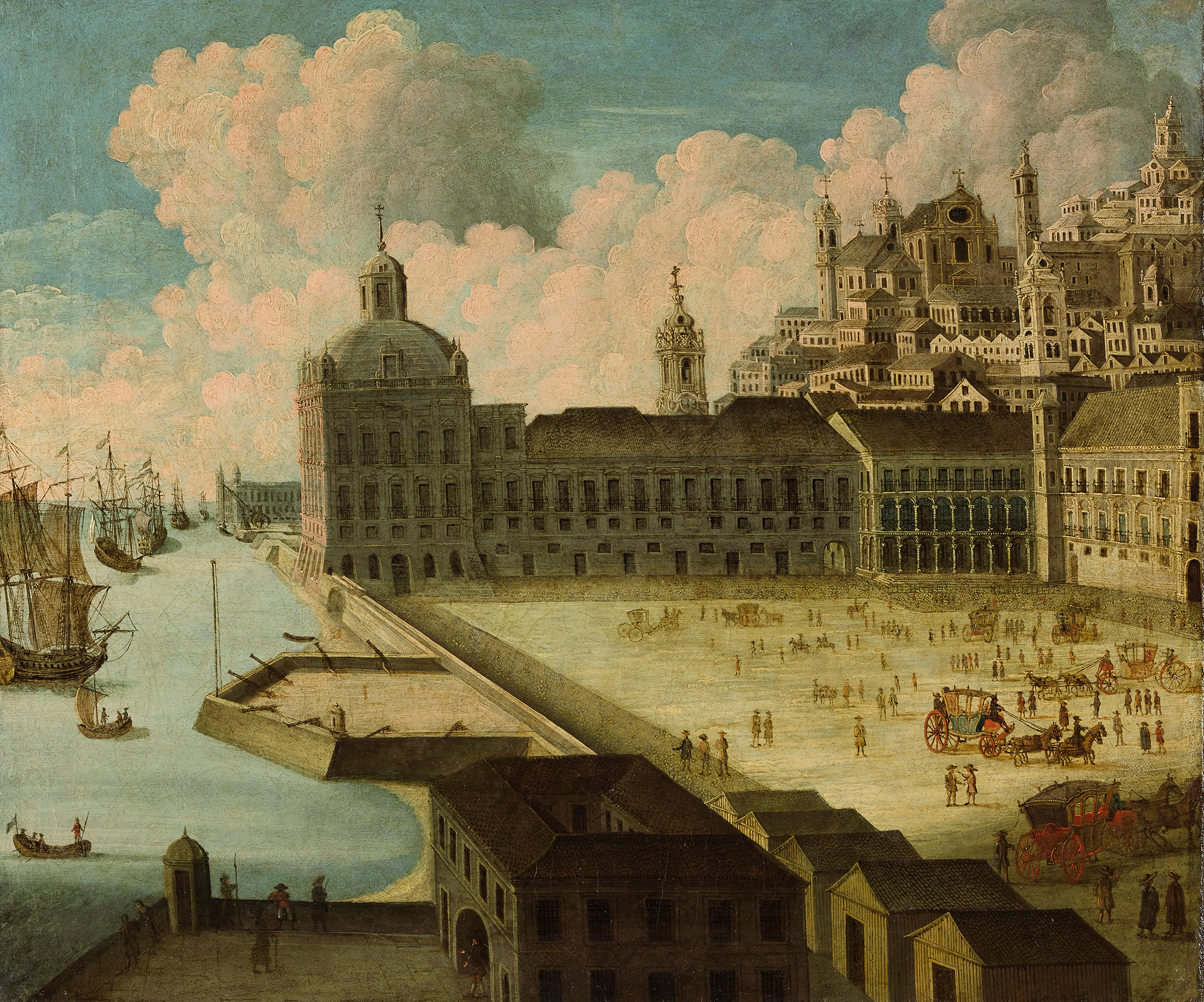
Ribeira Palace in its mid-18th century Mannerist and Baroque form, only years before its destruction in the 1755 Lisbon earthquake.

Ribeira Palace (Portuguese pronunciation: [ʁiˈbɐjɾɐ]; Portuguese: Paço da Ribeira) was the main residence of the Kings of Portugal, in Lisbon, for around 250 years. Its construction was ordered by King Manuel I of Portugal when he found the Royal Alcáçova of São Jorge unsuitable. The palace complex underwent numerous reconstructions and reconfigurations from the original Manueline design, ending with its final Mannerist and Baroque form.

The Ribeira Palace, as well as most of the city of Lisbon, was destroyed in the 1755 earthquake. After the earthquake, the reigning monarch, King José I, suffered from claustrophobia and chose to live the rest of his life in a group of pavilions in the hills of Ajuda, and thus the palace was never rebuilt.

Today, Lisbon's primary square, the Praça do Comércio, is situated on the site of the former palace. The square is still popularly referred to as the Terreiro do Paço ("Palace Yard/Square"), reminiscent of the now destroyed royal residence.

== History ==
=== Manueline era ===
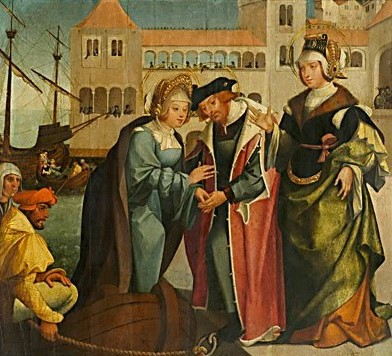
A 16th-century painting of the Holy Martyrs of Lisbon uses Ribeira Palace in the background as a metonym for the city: King Manuel I's original palace, done in the Manueline style, was the head of his royal and imperial administration.

After the Siege of Lisbon, in 1147, the monarchs of Portugal had used the Palace of Alcáçova, in the São Jorge Castle, as their residence while in Lisbon, which did not become Portugal's definite capital until 1225. Over the years, various Portuguese monarchs added to the Palace of Alcáçova, and by the time King Manuel I of Portugal succeeded the throne, the Palace of Alcáçova was a large, but cramped, complex, not fitting with the tastes of King Manuel I. With his lucrative profits from Portugal's monopoly on the spice trade, King Manuel I set off on a building spree, renovating the Lisbon landscape, and starting with the construction of a new royal palace.

The groundbreaking of the palace was in 1498. The new palace was not to be located on a high and easily protected fortress hill, like the Palace of Alcáçova was, but instead was built on the river shore of the Tagus river, giving it the name of Ribeira Palace, or Palace of the Riverside. The new royal palace was located in the heart of renaissance Lisbon, which had become one of the most important cities and ports in all Europe, on account of its importance in the spice trade and Age of Discoveries. Ribeira palace was situated next to the Ribeira das Naus shipyard and near all the major Lisbon trading houses.

In 1502, the palace had been built large enough so that the Portuguese Royal Court could begin moving into the palace. In 1508, King Manuel I started expansion works on the palace, which ended in 1510, and appointed Diogo de Arruda as head architect of the project. The King was an absolutist in all manners, and sought to concentrate all his powers in Ribeira Palace, by holding the Portuguese Cortes and installing the Casa da Índia, the imperial administration, in the palace's walls.

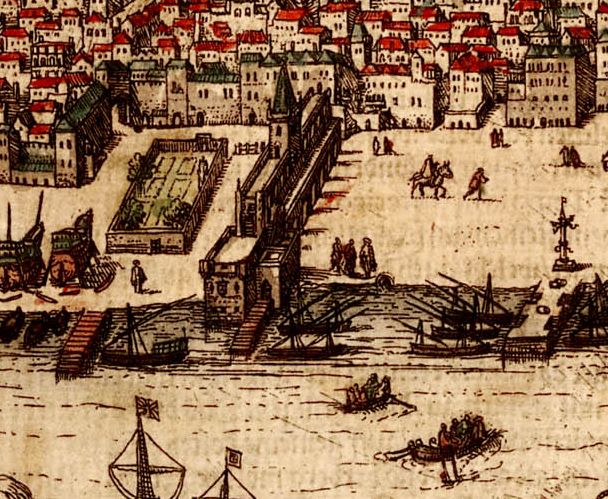
Ribeira Palace after the King John III's renovations. Alterations can be seen in the King's Tower.

The palace of King Manuel I, and his successors until King Henry I of Portugal, was a true palace of the Portuguese Renaissance. Done in the Manueline style, among others, the palace included various wings, loggia, balconies, gardens, and courtyards. The main loggia of the palace, facing the Terreiro do Paço, followed the style employed by King Manuel I at many of his palaces, most notably at the Royal Palace of Évora.

The hallmark of the palace, not just in the Manueline era but in all its history, was its Tower of the King, in the southern wing. During the Manueline era, the Casa da Índia was installed in the tower, which hoisted a large sculpture of the Royal Coat of Arms of Portugal on the exterior of the tower, facing the river. Starting in 1525, King John III sponsored a set of enlargements and renovations to the palace, which, most notably, altered the Tower of the King, expanding it and opening a large balcony, faced towards the Tagus.

It was during the Manueline era, when the House of Aviz ruled Portugal, that the Portuguese Renaissance truly flourished, and Ribeira Palace was one of its centers. It was a beacon for artists, scientists, navigators, and noblemen from all over Portugal and Europe alike. It was at Ribeira Palace, in 1515, that Gil Vicente, the father of Portuguese and Spanish theatre, first performed his play Quem Tem Farelos? for King Manuel I. The palace was also where other great Portuguese and European artists and scholars presented themselves, including Luís de Camões, Portuguese playwright, Cristóvão de Morais, Portuguese painter, and Pedro Nunes, Portuguese mathematician and royal tutor.

=== Philippine era ===
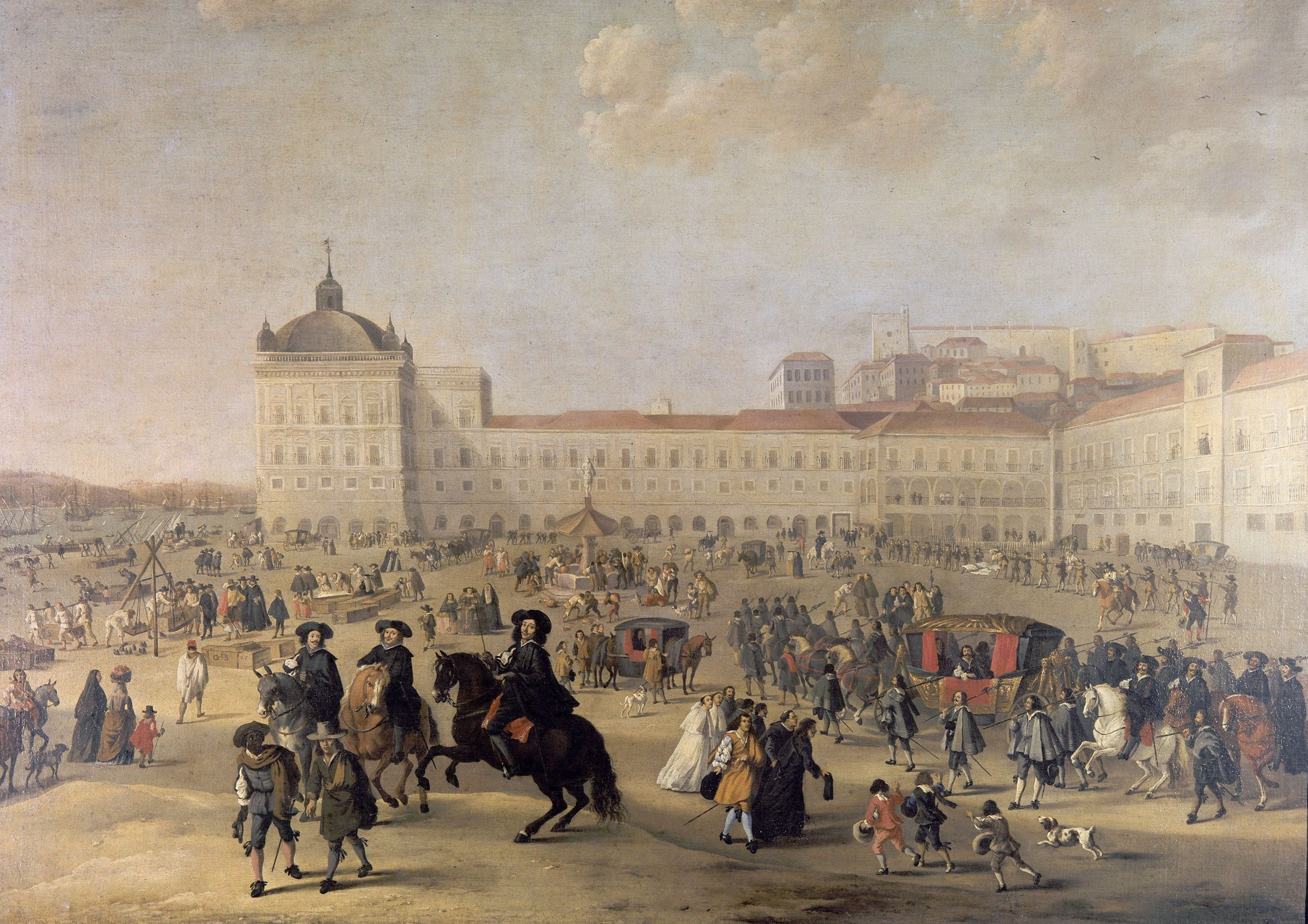
During the Philippine era, the palace changed hugely, scrapping the original Manueline for a Mannerist style.

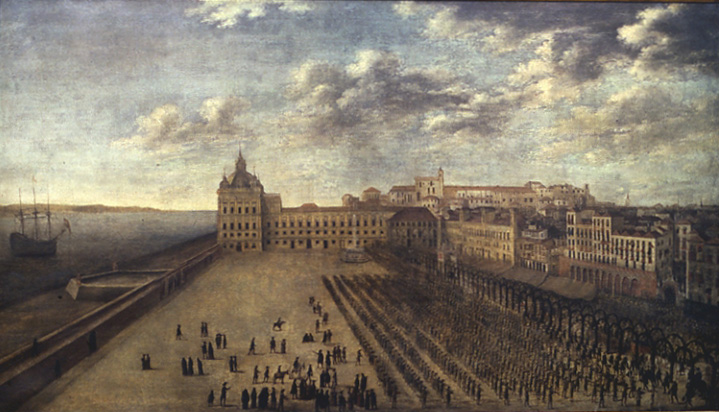
Catherine of Braganza departs from the Palace Square, en route to England, 23 April 1662

When the House of Habsburg seized the throne, in 1580, the newly acclaimed King Philip I of Portugal started a large series of constructions and renovations throughout Portugal, seeking to rehabilitate the kingdom after the War of the Portuguese Succession. During his three-year stay in Lisbon, from 1580 to 1583, King Philip I, who also ruled as King of Castile, Aragon, and Naples, considered turning Lisbon into the imperial capital of his trans-European monarchy and empire.

To better suit Lisbon for King Philip I's extravagant court, the King ordered the remodeling and expansion of Ribeira Palace, under the authority of Filipe Terço, the Master of the Royal Works. King Philip I decided to modernize the palace, stripping it of its early renaissance, Manueline style and planning and converting Ribeira Palace into a monumental, organized Mannerist complex. The highlight of the Philippine renovations was the reconstruction and enlargement of the Tower of the King, which transformed a three-story Manueline tower, which housed the Casa da Índia, into a five-story Mannerist tower, complete with an observatory and one of the largest royal libraries in all of Europe.To beautify the palace the monarch commissioned several artists, such as Correggio, Rubens and, most famously, Titian, who made a massive painting on the ceiling of the Royal Library portraying Philip II holding a globe and being crowned.

When King Philip I left Lisbon, in 1583, Ribeira Palace became the official seat of the Council of Portugal and the residence of the Viceroys of Portugal. King Philip I's successors, King Philip II, and King Philip III, did not continue his legacy of stressing the importance of Lisbon, and instead visited their Portuguese capital only on rare ceremonial occasions. However, each time King Philip II and King Philip III visited Ribeira Palace, they ordered the construction of a ceremonial arch for the palace's Terreiro do Paço, culminating in a large series or triumphal and ceremonial arches by the end of the Philippine era.

=== Brigantine era ===
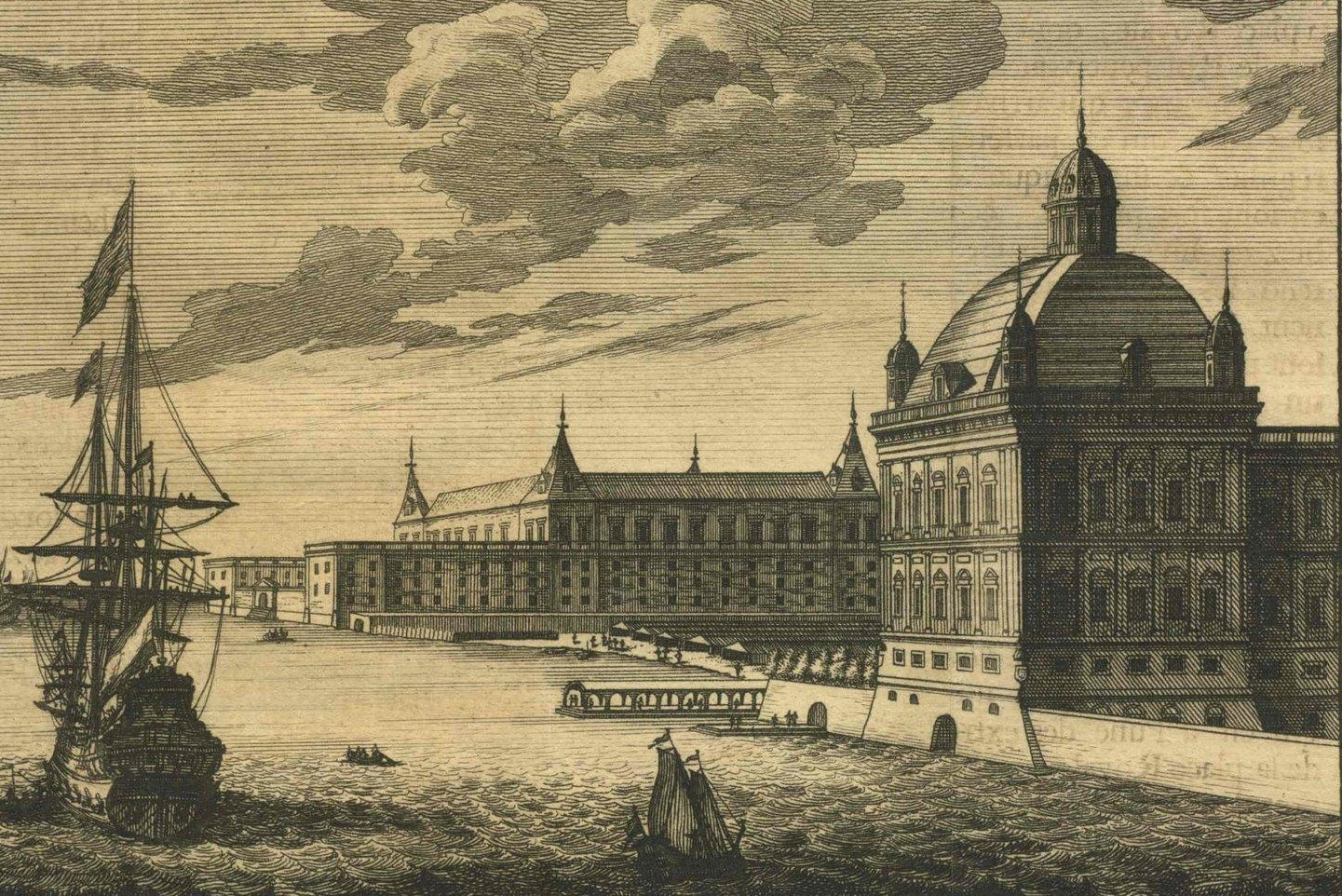
Ribeira Palace of the Brigantine era was a vast and modern palatial complex, including an opera and cathedral. On the left, there is the Corte Real palace

Another king to improve the palace was John V, who invested great sums – derived from the gold mines in colonial Brazil – to enlarge and embellish the Ribeira Palace. Deciding against building a new palace in the capital from scratch due to both monetary concerns and outcry from the court, King John V turned his attention to the Ribeira Palace. The original manueline chapel was turned into a magnificent baroque church, and the palace gained another wing for the queen, parallel to the previous one, commissioned to the Italian Antonio Cannevari. Later in the century, King Joseph I built a Royal Opera House by the palace, designed by the Italian Giuseppe Bibiena.

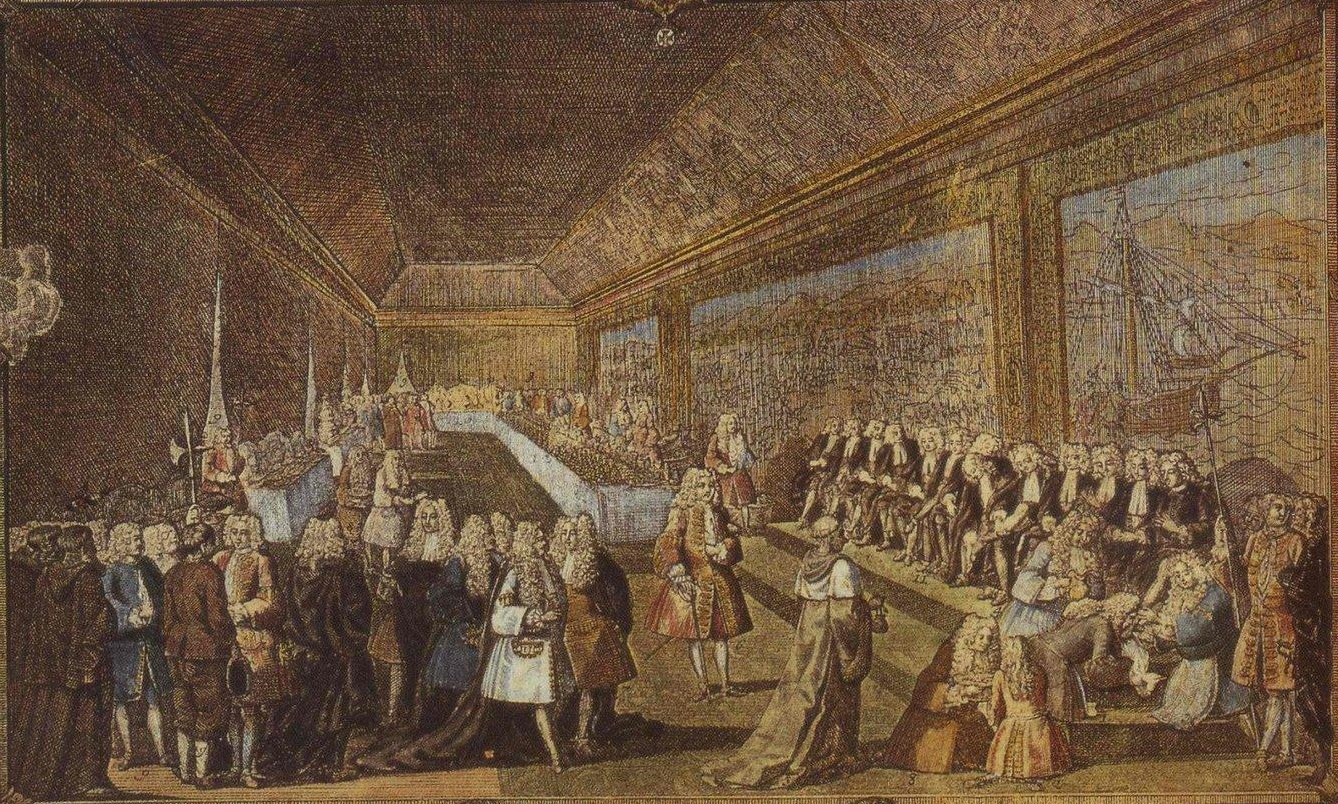
"Washing of the Feet by John V of Portugal", one of the few representations of the interior of the Ribeira Palace (1748)

The Ópera do Tejo, inaugurated in 1755, lasted only a few months. On 1 November 1755, a huge earthquake, and resulting tsunami and fire destroyed the palace and most of Lisbon. The 70,000-volume royal library housed within the palace, as well as hundreds of works of art, were lost. The royal archives disappeared together with detailed historical records of explorations by Vasco da Gama and other early navigators. King Joseph I was not at the palace and survived. His prime minister, the 1st Marquis of Pombal, coordinated a massive reconstruction effort that would give rise to the Pombaline Downtown of Lisbon. The royal family abandoned the Ribeira area and moved to palaces in the areas of Ajuda and Belém.

The old Palace Square (Terreiro do Paço) gave rise to a new square, the Pombaline Commerce Square (Praça do Comércio). The two towers at the corners of the square are still reminiscent of the old tower of the Ribeira Palace.

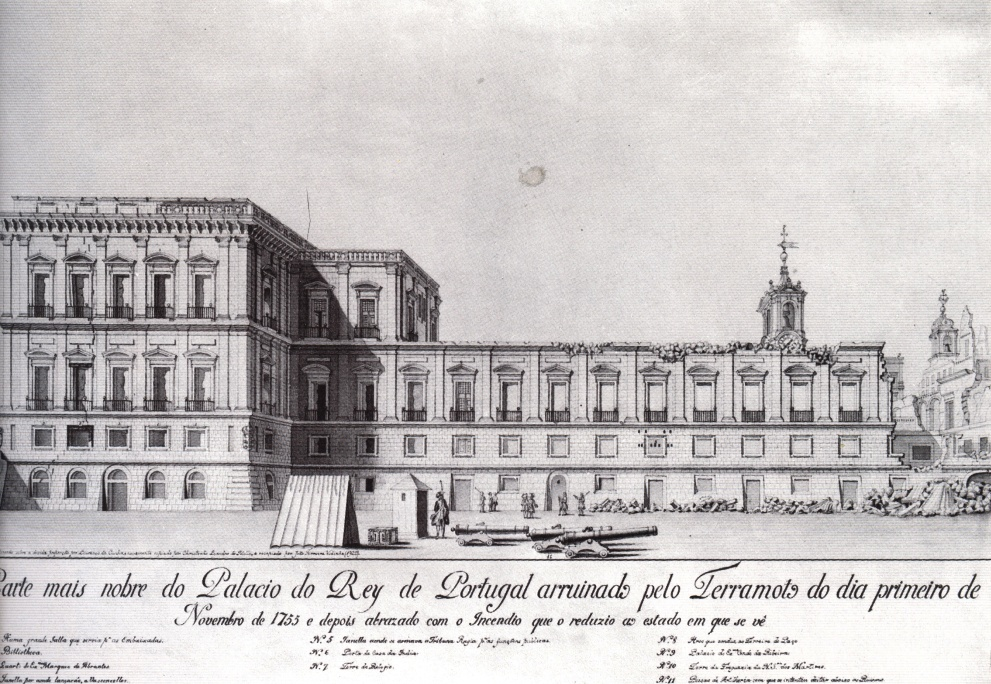
After the 1755 earthquake, enough of Ribeira Palace's frame stood to reconstruct, but it was demolished.

== See also ==
- Pombaline Downtown
- Praça do Comércio

== Literature ==
- Bruno A Martinho (2009). O Paço da Ribeira nas Vésperas do Terramoto (Dissertação de Mestrado em História de Arte) (Thesis). Lisbon: Universidade Nova de Lisboa. p. 294.
