= St Winwaloe's Church, Gunwalloe =

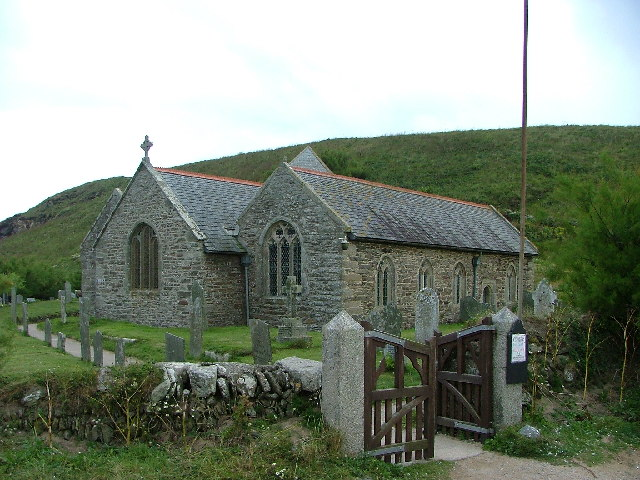
- St Winwaloe's Church, Gunwalloe
- St Winwaloe's Church, Gunwalloe
- 50°02′20″N 5°16′09″W
- Location: Gunwalloe
- Country: England
- Denomination: Church of England

History
- Dedication: St Winwaloe

Administration
- Province: Province of Canterbury
- Diocese: Diocese of Truro
- Archdeaconry: Cornwall
- Deanery: Kerrier
- Parish: Cury and Gunwalloe
- Location within Cornwall

Listed Building – Grade I
- Official name: Church of St Winwaloe
- Designated: 10 July 1957
- Reference no.: 1157975

The Church of Saint Winwaloe is the Grade I listed parish church of Gunwalloe in Cornwall, England.

== History ==
The church is in the Church of England Diocese of Truro and is dedicated to Saint Winwaloe. It is likely to have been standing since at least the 15th century due to its characteristic three hall church design, although some parts can be dated back to the 13th century, and one of the fonts is believed to be Norman.

The small cross in the churchyard was found in the 19th century and taken to Penrose. At a later date it was placed in the churchyard.

The church was used to film a wedding scene in The Lady of Pendower in 1934. As part of the preparations, a track 130 feet (40 m) long was built to move the film camera along as the characters exited the church to achieve a tracking shot.

== Bell tower ==
The church has a detached bell tower, similar to those at Feock and Gwennap, which may date from before the 15th century. The bell tower uses a set of six batons laid out similar to piano keys, and three medieval bells. These were recast in 1926.

== Parish status ==
The church is in a joint parish with St Corentine's Church, Cury. The Rev. Sandys Wason was perpetual curate of both Cury and Gunwalloe from 1905 to 1920.

== Gallery ==
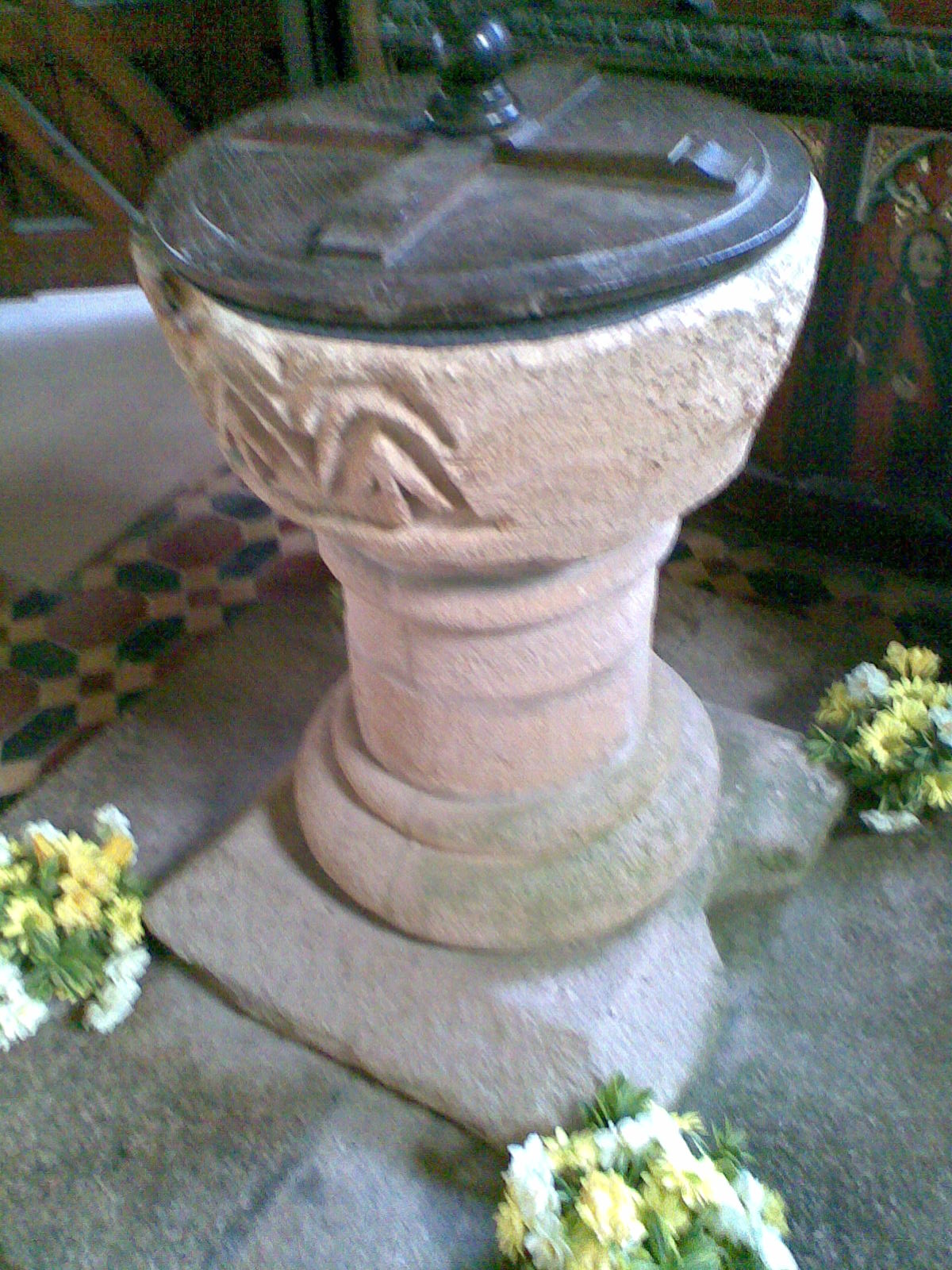
The Norman font

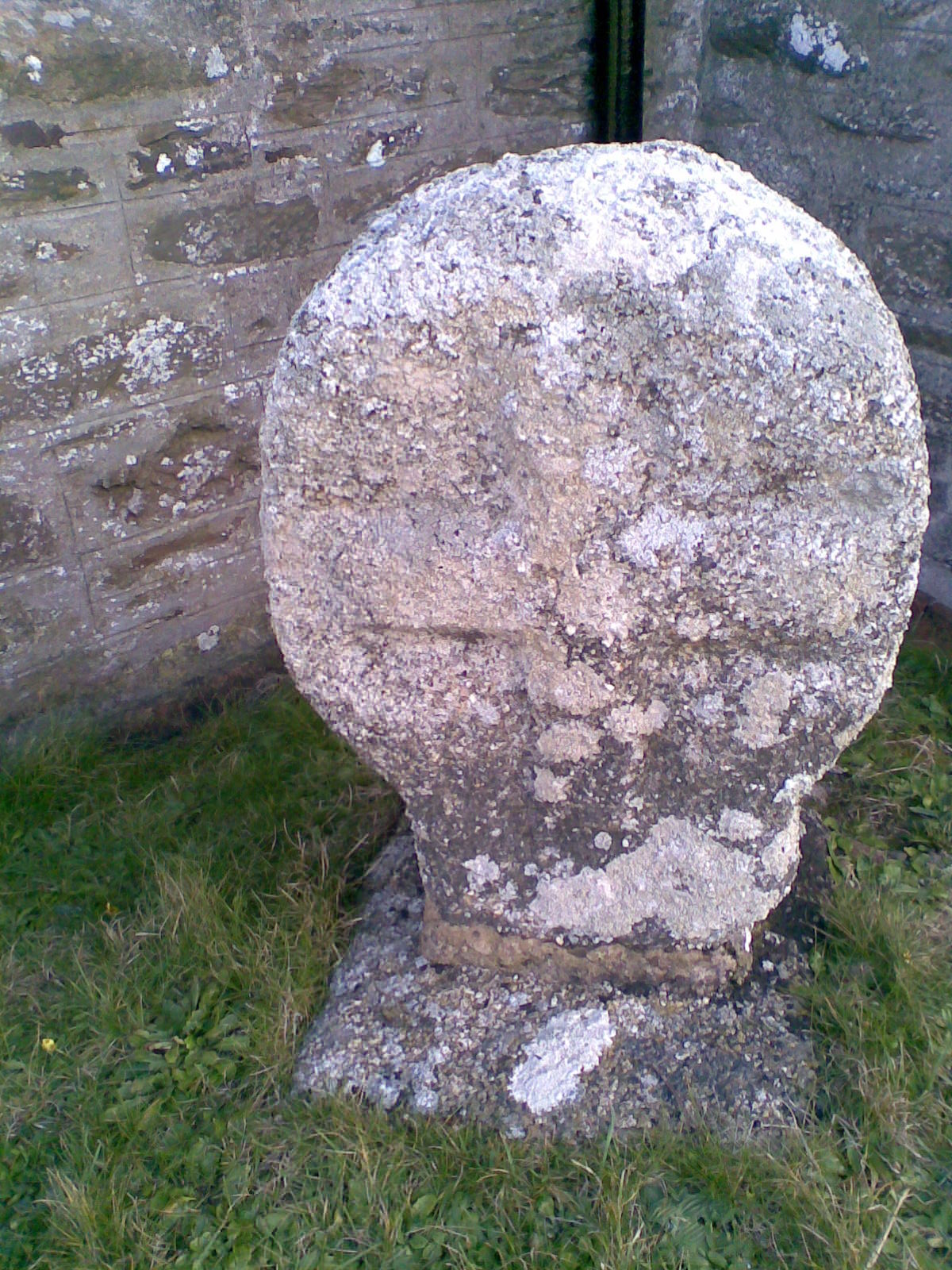
A Cornish cross in the churchyard
