= St Corentine's Church, Cury =

St Corentine’s Church, Cury
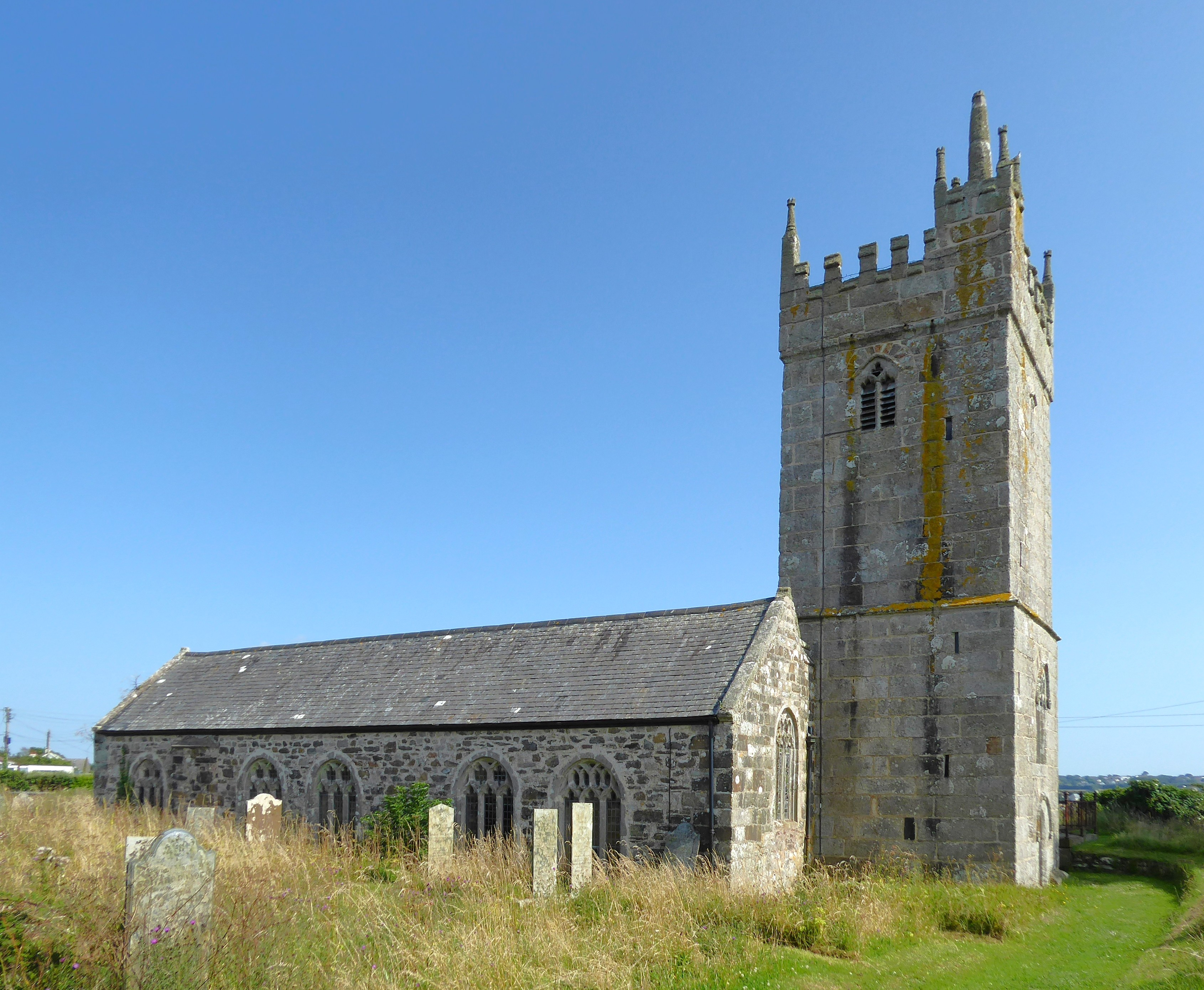
- St Corentine’s Church, Cury
- St Corentine’s Church, Cury
- 50°02′47″N 5°14′45.78″W
- Location: Cury
- Country: England
- Denomination: Church of England
- Churchmanship: High Church

History
- Dedication: St Corentine

Administration
- Province: Province of Canterbury
- Diocese: Diocese of Truro
- Archdeaconry: Cornwall
- Deanery: Kerrier
- Parish: Cury and Gunwalloe
- Location within Cornwall

Listed Building – Grade I
- Official name: Church of Saint Corentin
- Designated: 10 July 1957
- Reference no.: 1157903

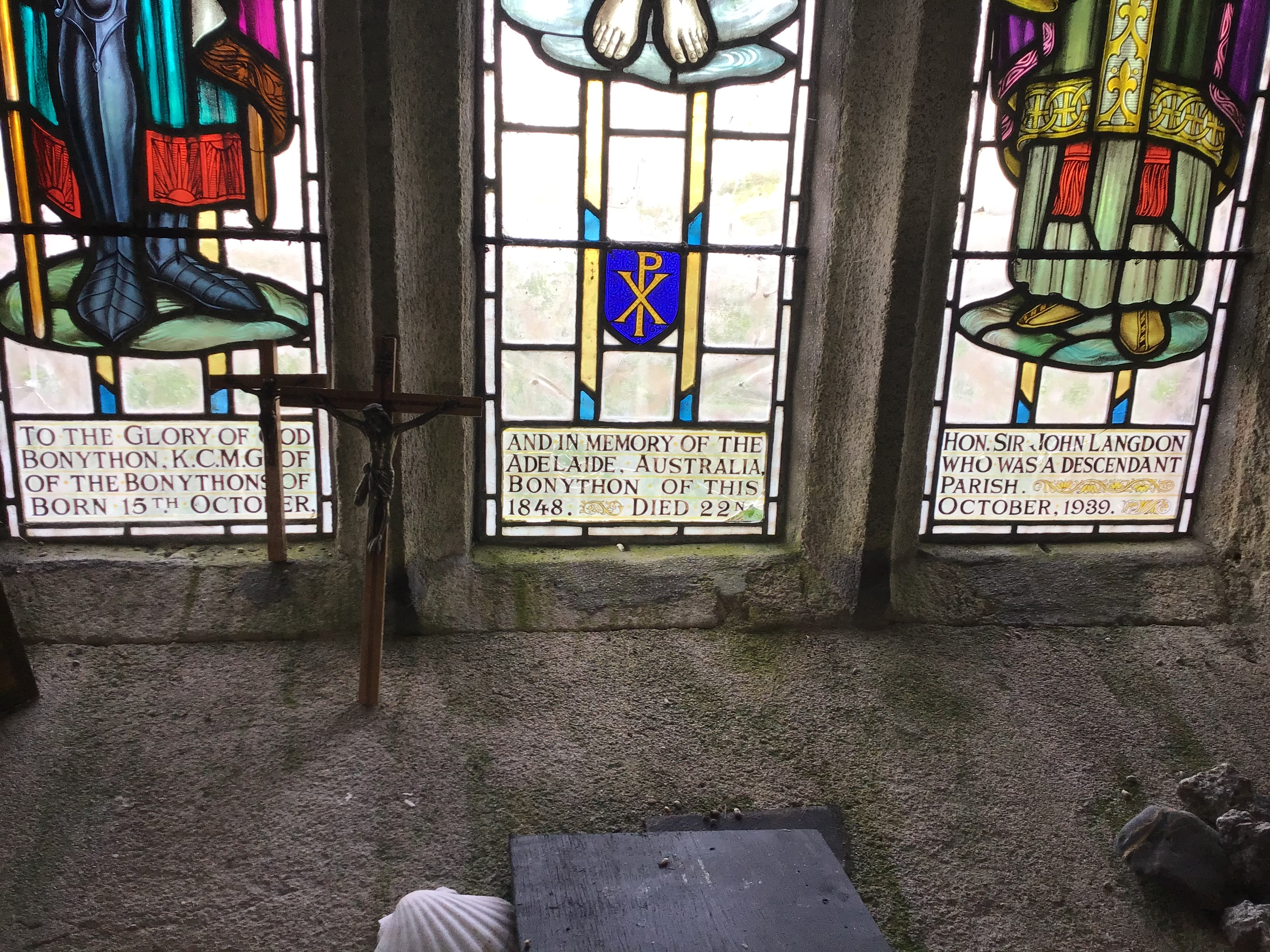
A stained glass window memorializing John Langdon Bonython is indicative of the Cornish ancestry of the Bonython family of South Australia.

St Corentine's Church, Cury is a Grade I listed parish church in the Church of England in Cury, Cornwall, England, UK.

== History ==
The parish church is dedicated to St Corentin. The building is cruciform and of the Norman period, but a north aisle was added in the 15th century. It was probably originally a manorial church of Winnianton but became a chapelry of Breage in the 13th century.

The church was restored in 1874 but the restoration was carried out locally without the supervision of an architect. The work was superintended by the Reverend A H Cummings, who employed the village mason, carpenter, blacksmith and glazier. The north wall was taken down and rebuilt. The roof of the north aisle was repaired and boarded inside, and enriched with carved oak bosses. The roofs of the nave, chancel and Bochym aisle were re-constructed. The church was reseated and the windows were re-glazed with Cathedral glass. The expense of the restoration of the Bochym aisle was borne by Richard and Sydney Davey of Bochym, and the entire cost of the works was £900. It reopened on 23 July 1874.

=== Sandys Wason ===
From 1905 to 1920 the parishes of Cury and Gunwalloe were served by the Rev Sandys Wason as priest-in-charge. Father Wason was an Anglo-Catholic and unpopular with some parishioners; he wrote poems such as "Town" ("I met a clergymanly man, Prostrated in the Strand, He sucked a brace of oranges, One orange in each hand" is the first verse).

He is notable for the controversy aroused by his ministry due to his practice of liturgical borrowing from the Roman Catholic Church and other aspects of it. The church members protested against the Anglo Catholic services which he conducted and wrote a resolution of protest to the Bishop of Truro to restore the services in the Book of Common Prayer. Though disciplined by successive bishops of Truro (Charles Stubbs and Winfrid Burrows) he persisted in his ways. He was turned out of his church by the Bishop, but he refused to vacate the vicarage and held services there. When at last the Bishop deprived him of ecclesiastical preferment in the diocese and of the living, the dispute reached an acute phase when the vicar refused to allow his Bishop to conduct services in his church. Eventually a group of his opponents ejected him from the parish by force and he took refuge at St Hilary with Bernard Walke. Subsequently, he carried on the business of Cope and Fenwick, publishers, in London.

== Parish status ==
The church is in a joint parish with

- St Winwaloe's Church, Gunwalloe
