= Cinco Chagas =

Portuguese ship

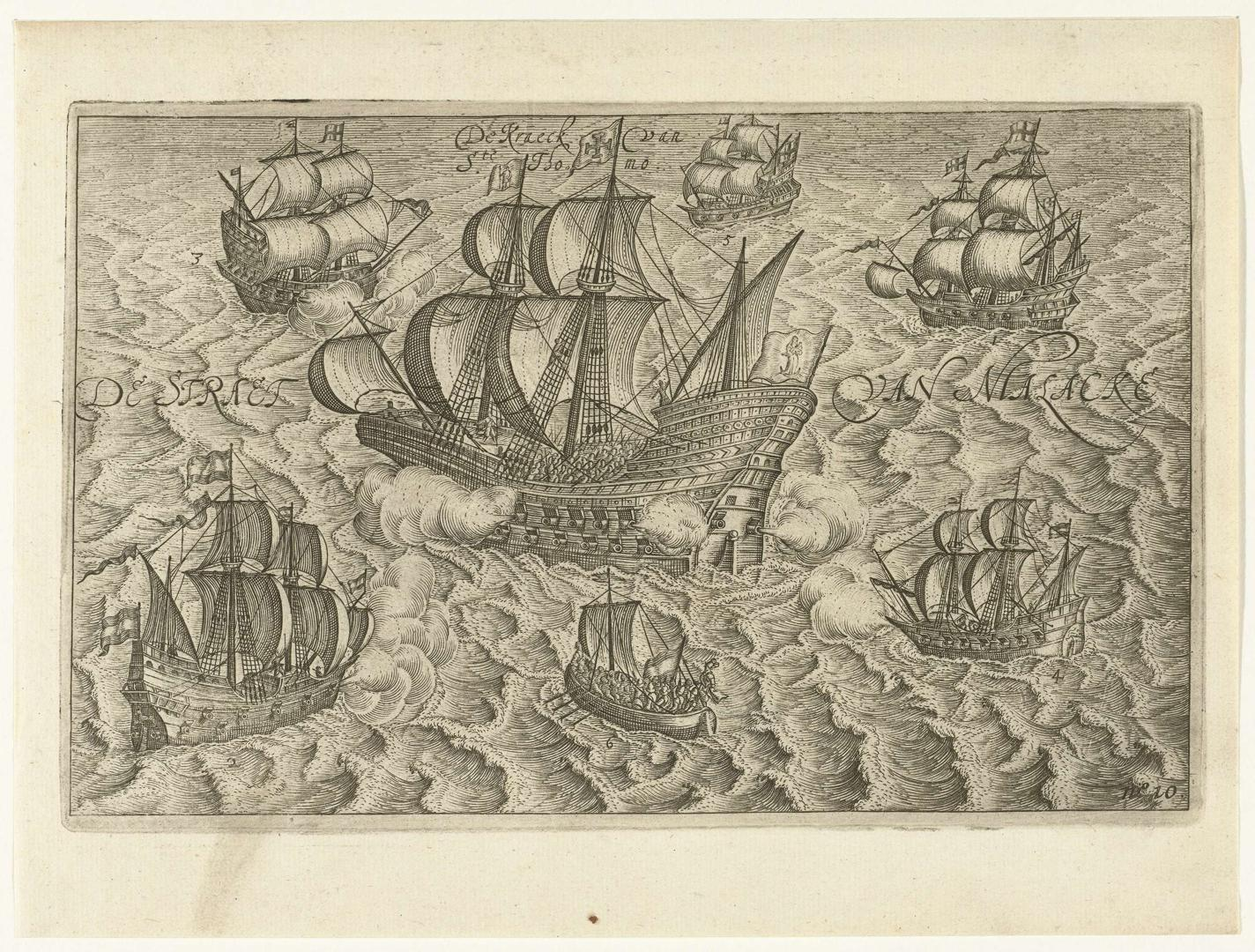
- Cinco Chagas is similar to this large Portuguese ship that was captured by the English and the Dutch in 1602.

History

Portugal
- Name: Cinco Chagas
- Builder: Constantino de Braganza
- Fate: Sunk, 22–23 June 1594

General characteristics
- Class & type: Carrack
- Tons burthen: 2,000 tons
- Complement: 1400 passengers

Cinco Chagas (English: Five Wounds) was a Portuguese nau (carrack) that was sunk during the action of Faial on 22–23 June 1594 during the Anglo-Spanish War. When it was sunk, the carrack was reportedly having a burden tonnage of 2,000 tons.

== Description and service ==
Cinco Chagas was built in Goa like her famous namesake thirty-two years previously. On her maiden voyage in 1593 Francisco de Mello was the captain. Reports suggest that she was overloaded with goods when departing from Goa in 1593. Cinco Chagas wintered in Mozambique, where it was determined that the ship was in very poor condition. The crew of around 1400 people (including 270 slaves). She was sunk during the action of Faial on 22–23 June 1594 in the Anglo-Spanish War. Before it sank the ship had been set on fire, and over five hundred people were killed. The English spared thirteen of the crew.

The cargo of Cinco Chagas (along with the salvaged cargo from the two other ships) was worth well in excess of 2,000,000 ducats, and in addition there were twenty-two treasure chests of diamonds, rubies, and pearls estimated to be worth US$15–20 billion by 2017 values. The prisoners that were saved told their captors that yielding had been impossible as the riches were for the king of Spain and Portugal and that the captain, being highly in the king's favor, would upon his return have been made viceroy in the Indies. Estimates of the Cinco Chagas's location suggest that it lies in seas over one mile deep in the Atlantic Ocean eighteen miles south of the channel between Pico Island and Faial along with its precious cargo of diamonds and gems. The wreck has been searched for by treasure hunters but no signs have been found partly due to the depth.

== See also ==
- List of longest wooden ships
- Madre de Deus
- Santa Catarina (ship)
- Henry Grace à Dieu
- São João Baptista (galleon)
- Baochuan
- Ganj-i-Sawai
- Javanese jong
