= Cross Lanes, Cornwall =

Coordinates: 50°02′46″N 5°13′34″W

Cross Lanes
- Hamlet
- Location within Cornwall
- OS grid reference: SW 6924 2149
- Civil parish: Cury
- Unitary authority: Cornwall
- Ceremonial county: Cornwall
- Region: South West
- Country: England
- Sovereign state: United Kingdom
- Post town: HELSTON
- Postcode district: TR12
- Dialling code: 01326
- Police: Devon and Cornwall
- Fire: Cornwall
- Ambulance: South Western
- UK Parliament: St Ives

Cross Lanes is a hamlet in the parish of Cury, Cornwall, England. Cross Lanes lies within the Cornwall Area of Outstanding Natural Beauty (AONB).
