= Action of Faial =

1594 naval engagement during the Anglo-Spanish War

- Part of the Anglo–Spanish War
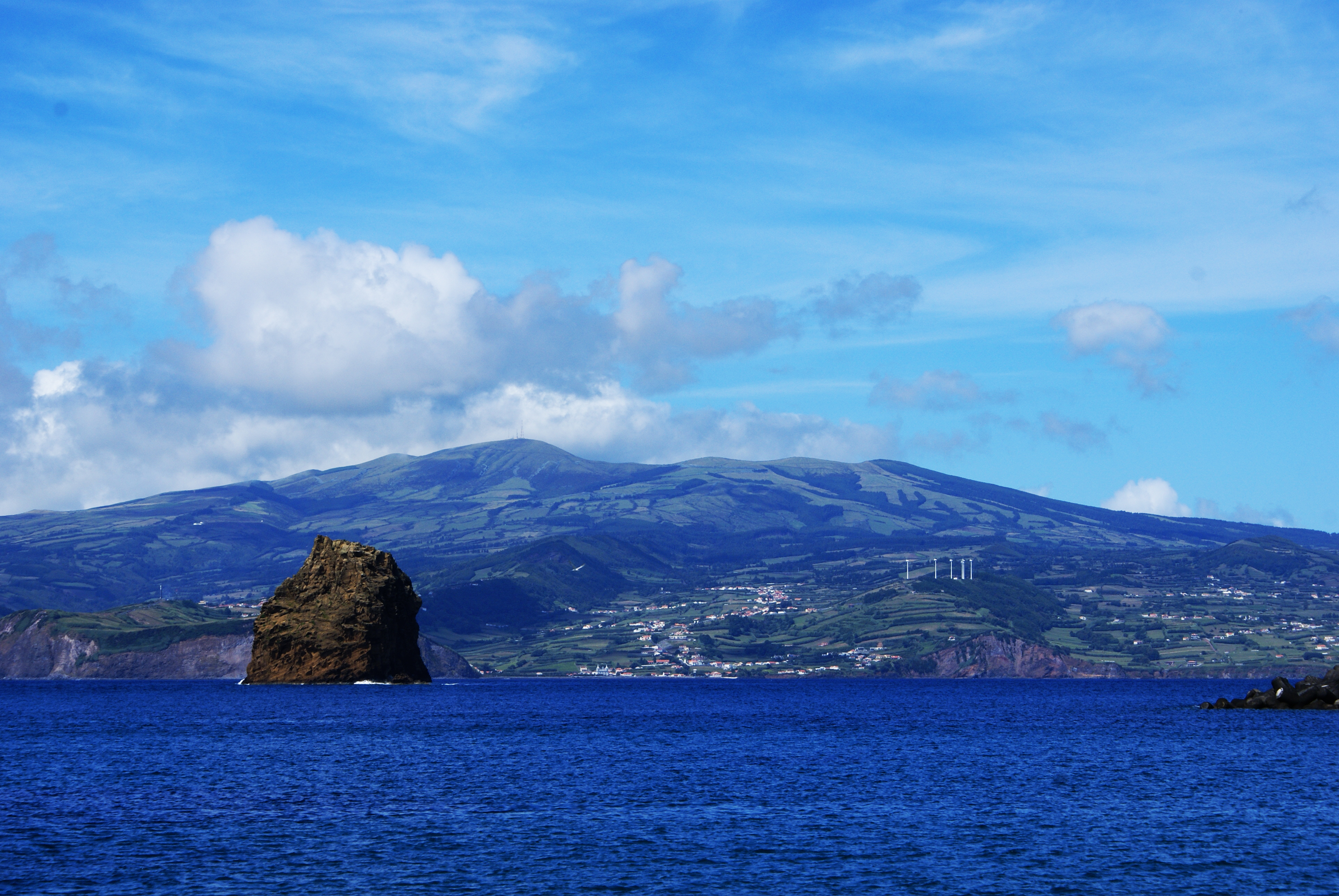
- Faial Island, off which the action was fought
| Date | 22–23 June 1594 |
| Location | Off Faial Island, Azores, Atlantic Ocean 38°18′N 28°36′W |
| Result | English victory |

Belligerents
| (Spain) Iberian Union: Portugal | England |

Commanders and leaders
| Francisco de Melo Canaveado | Earl of Cumberland |

Strength
| 1 carrack of 2,000 tons 700 men | 3 galleons of 250–300 tons 420 sailors |

Casualties and losses
| 1 carrack destroyed 600 killed or wounded 13 survived/captured | 60 killed or wounded (35 killed in explosion) |

The Action of Faial or the Battle of Faial Island was a naval engagement that took place on 22–23 June 1594 during the Anglo-Spanish War in which the large and richly laden 2,000-ton Portuguese carrack Cinco Chagas was destroyed by an English privateer fleet after a long and bitter battle off Faial Island in the Azores. The carrack, which was reputedly one of the richest ever to set sail from the Indies, was lost in an explosion which denied the English, as well as the Portuguese and Spanish, the treasure.

== Background ==
By virtue of the Iberian Union, the Anglo-Portuguese Treaty of 1373 was in abeyance, and as the Anglo–Spanish War was still ongoing, Portuguese shipping was a fair target for the English navy and privateers. At the latter end of 1593, the Earl of Cumberland, hoping to capitalize on the success of the previous year's capture of the Madre de Deus, prepared at his own expense three ships of 250 to 300 tons, with two artillery decks each and a total of 420 sailors and soldiers. These ships included the Royal Exchange, owned by London Merchants William Holliday, Thomas Cordell and William Garraway, and of which George Cave was captain; the Mayflower, Vice Admiral under the command of William Anthony; and the Sampson, under Nicholas Downton. There was also a support pinnace, the Violet.

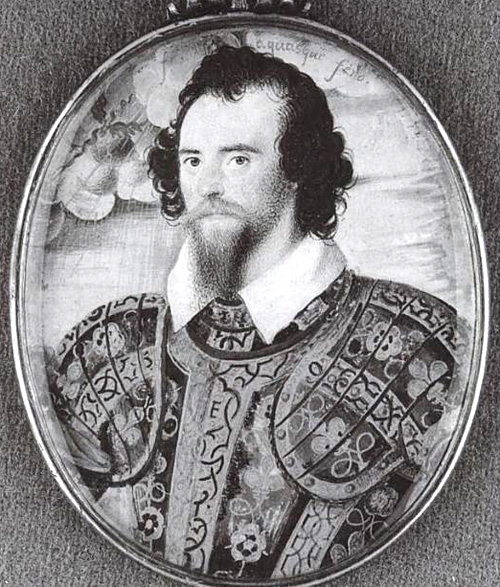
George Clifford, 3rd Earl of Cumberland

On 6 April 1594 Cumberland's fleet set sail from Plymouth, heading for the Azores. En route they roamed the coast of Portugal and Spain, capturing a number of ships. Off Viana do Castelo, Portugal, a 28-ton barque was captured as it headed towards Portuguese Angola. Near the islands of Berlengas another three Portuguese and Spanish caravels were taken, one of which had twelve butts of Spanish wine and another a small chest of silver. These were sent back to England under prize crews aboard the Violet while the rest of the fleet continued towards the Azores. They were hoping to avoid Alonso de Bazán's Spanish fleet, which was on the lookout for Cumberland after his failure to intercept him two years earlier.

On 22 June 1594, as they approached Faial Island, the Mayflower saw a great sail approach them and realized it belonged to a huge Portuguese carrack. The carrack was the Cinco Chagas ("Five Wounds"), a thirty-two gun, 2,000-ton carrack which had departed from Goa heading for Portugal in 1593, under the command of Francisco de Mello; it was later described as one of the "greatest naus that ever were in the Carreira, loaded with great wealthness and precious stones and all the best of India".

The fleet leaving Goa had also included Santo Alberto and Nossa Senhora da Nazareth; both sprang fatal leaks earlier in the voyage and were beached on the coast of Mozambique. Cinco Chagas took aboard such cargo in diamonds and other precious gems as had been salvaged from the two lost ships, as well as their 400 passengers and crew members, of which 230 were slaves. Among them were also two VIPs: Nuno Velho Pereira, the former colonial governor of Mozambique, and Dom Braz Correia, the captain of the fleet that had been returning from the Indies. The Chagas called in at Luanda, in Portuguese Angola, for supplies, where they took aboard more slaves which constituted more mouths to feed. By the time the Chagas reached the Azores, disease had claimed almost half the complement, many of whom were women and children, and much of the food had been thrown overboard in order to lighten the ship during gales off South Africa. The carrack attempted to reach the island of Corvo in order to replenish these lost provisions, but contrary winds prevented this, and so she tacked towards Faial. Soon afterwards, however, the lookouts on Chagas spotted the English ships, and prepared for battle.

== Battle ==
At noon all four ships began exchanging broadsides and musket volleys in a battle that lasted for nearly a whole day. The English ships tried to board the Cinco Chagas but were repelled by the larger Portuguese numbers. As casualties mounted on both sides the decks of the carrack were cluttered with the dead and wounded.

The battle went on with the English trying to board the ship three times. All three attempts were repelled by the Portuguese, putting up a brave fight knowing the riches were too great to lose. George Cave, captain of the Mayflower, was killed, which discouraged his men from attacking. The crew of Sampson was repulsed with losses and fighting continued for several hours with the four ships moored to each other. Shortly after, the other two ships, having lost hope of mastering Chagas, drifted off and Nicholas Downton was severely wounded and William Antony later was mortally wounded.

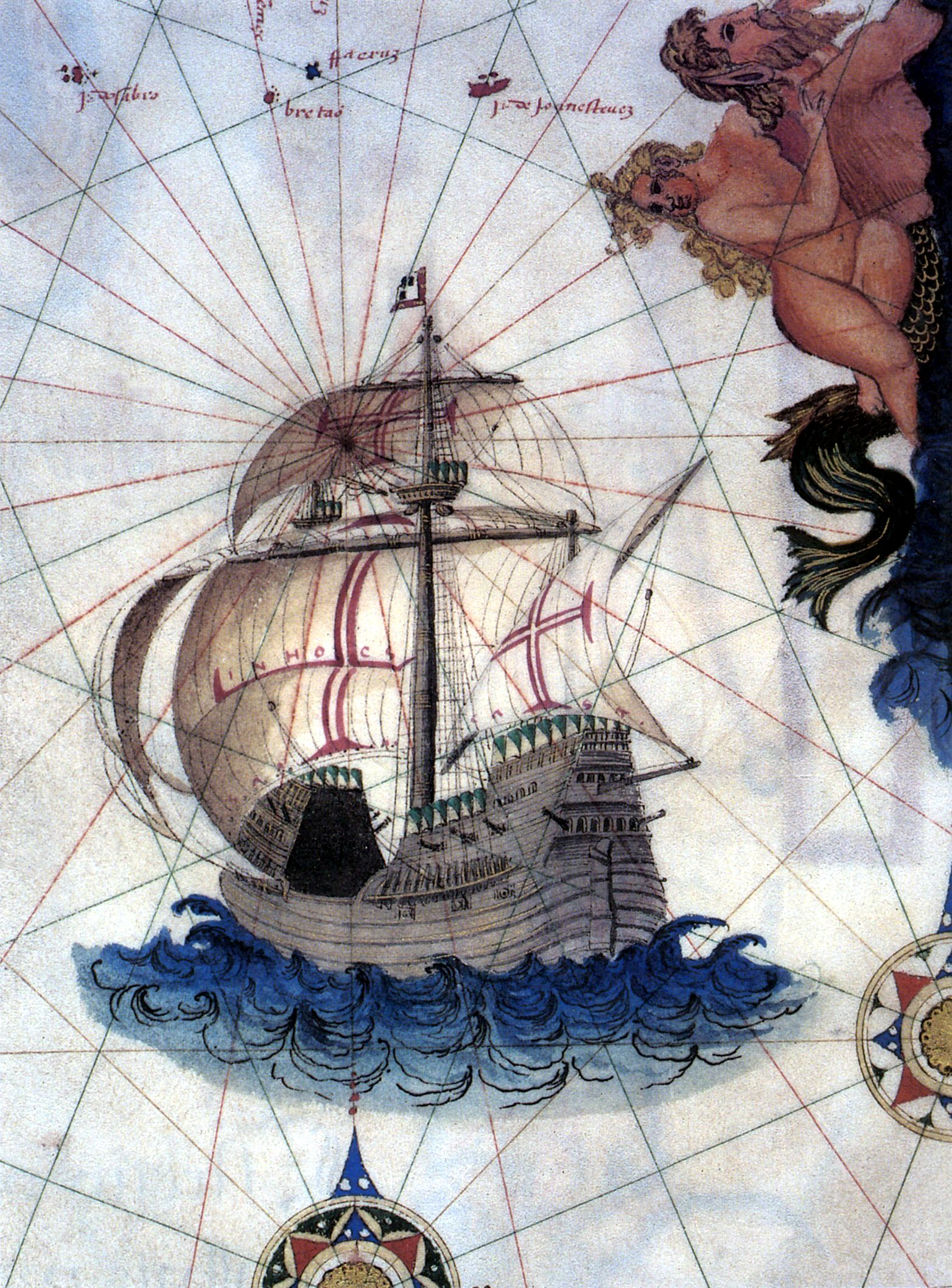
Typical Portuguese carrack during most of the 16th century. By the end of the 16th century, the Cinco Chagas had already differed from this design.

The English, having noticed that Cinco Chagas had no guns aft, returned to the attack in a deft manoeuvre and concentrated their fire on the stern panel of the carrack. The Royal Exchange made another boarding attempt, this time succeeding in carrying the ship after bitter fighting. Whilst the heavy hand-to-hand fighting was ongoing, a fire started on a tarpaulin and then spread further to the rigging and the masts. The fire could not be put out because sharpshooters on board the English ships were taking the Portuguese one by one as they tried to man the pumps.

According to the only known eyewitness account, written by Melchior Estácio do Amaral in 1604:

the sea was purple with blood dripping from the scuppers, the decks cluttered with the dead and the fire raging in some parts of the ships, and the air so filled with smoke that, not only we could sometimes not see each other but we could not recognize each other.

Seeing the fire spreading out of control and with the English gaining the upper hand, the Portuguese decided to abandon ship, grabbing anything that could float. At the same time the English came among them in some armed boats, and began shooting or lancing the helpless Portuguese in the water. It became apparent that the only people being spared this butchery were women who were stripping off their outer clothing, "in the hope of piety from the English". However, one lady, Dona Isabel Pereira, whose late husband Diogo de Melo Coutinho had been Captain-major and Tanadar-mor of Ceylon, and her 16-year-old daughter Dona Luisa de Melo Coutinho, steadfastly refused to undress for the privateers and, tying themselves together with a sash of St. Francis (i.e., the cord which a Franciscan friar would tie around his waist), they went to the opposite side of the ship from the English and leapt into the sea. They were buried on Faial where their dead bodies washed ashore, still bound together, the next day.

When the fire became completely out of control the English decided to lay off from the Chagas and "worked furiously to disengage their ships". The carrack burned all through the night until just after dawn, when the flames reached the powder magazine in her lower hold, containing "her poulder which was lowest being 60 barrels" which then ignited and "blew her abroad, so that most of the ship did swim in parts above the water".

The explosion was enormous, killing hundreds of Portuguese including men, women and children, as well as nearly 35 English sailors who were still aboard when the ship exploded. Most were killed outright and the battle ended with the total loss of the Chagas and its cargo.

== Aftermath ==
The crew grabbed any floating remains that were of any use, which proved to be little, and the English began picking up survivors, of which there were only thirteen out of 600 Portuguese. The English fleet subsequently sailed further west in the hope of rich pickings, and encountered another carrack, the San Fellipe, two weeks later. With heavy losses already due to disease, and with officers wounded or killed, supplies running low, and a gale forcing them apart, Cumberland decided against engaging the carrack and sailed home.

The cargo of Cinco Chagas (along with the salvaged cargo from the two other ships) was worth well in excess of 2,000,000 ducats, and in addition there were twenty-two treasure chests of diamonds, rubies, and pearls estimated to be worth US$15–20 billion by 2017 values. The prisoners that were saved told their captors that yielding had been impossible as the riches were for the king of Spain and Portugal and that the captain, being highly in the king's favor, would upon his return have been made viceroy in the Indies.

With the destruction of the Chagas, Cumberland had to satisfy himself that the Portuguese and Spanish were denied any of the riches on board. He successfully evaded attempts by the Spanish navy to find him. Alonso de Bazán failed to intercept Cumberland partly because he was hoping to protect the West Indian treasure fleet which was still in the Caribbean. Another fleet under Don Antonio De Urquiola also failed to find the English, despite his having been in the same area when they headed home past Cape St. Vincent in September.

The fleet arrived in Portsmouth on 28 August, and the ships were thoroughly searched when they arrived by the Queen's troops, a consequence of the mass theft from the Madre de Deus two years earlier. Dom Nuno Velho Pereira and Dom Braz Correia had survived the explosion of the Chagas and were brought ashore as prisoners, where the Earl treated them well and entertained them for a whole year as his guests. They were then ransomed for 2,500 ducats each; Pereira paid for both, making Cumberland's 1594 expedition gain at least some reward. With this money the Earl then decided to finance and build a new, larger ship, rather than borrowing from the Queen; the new ship was launched in 1595 and was named by the Queen the Scourge of Malice.

== Legacy ==
According to the Venetian ambassador to Spain, the Cinco Chagas was the richest ship ever to sail from the East Indies.

Estimates of the location of the wreck of the Cinco Chagas suggest that it lies in seas over one mile deep in the Atlantic Ocean, eighteen miles south of the channel between Pico Island and Faial, along with its precious cargo of diamonds and other gems. The wreck has been searched for by treasure hunters but no signs have been found, partly because of the depth.
