= St Anthony (ship) =

Portuguese carrack wrecked off Cornwall, England

Coordinates: 50.050°N 5.287°W

History

Portugal
- Name: San Antonio
- Owner: King John (Joao) III
- Fate: Foundered 1527

General characteristics
- Tons burthen: 300 tons
- Sail plan: Carrack

St Anthony or Santo António was a Portuguese carrack that foundered in Gunwalloe Bay, Cornwall, in 1527 en route from Lisbon to Antwerp. She had a mixed cargo including copper and silver ingots. The wreck was recorded historically, because the salvage of the cargo was the subject of an international dispute that led to a Court of Star Chamber, but the location of the wreck was unknown until 1981. The wreck is designated under the Protection of Wrecks Act and is managed by Historic England.

== Ship ==
St Anthony was the personal property of King John III of Portugal and the flagship of his fleet. She was a carrack; these were largest ships of the time and the first truly oceangoing vessels. The cargo was particularly valuable, estimated to be worth at the time £18,800 (about 4,000 times a man's annual wage), and it is thought to have included the dowry of Princess Catherine, bride of King John III and sister of Charles V, the Holy Roman Emperor. The cargo manifest survives..

== Wrecking and salvage ==
The wreck occurred on 15 January 1527 in a storm described, in contemporary evidence, as great and urgent tempest of winds and weather and by the great outrages of the sea.

There were 45 survivors from a crew of 86. On the morning after the wreck, the winds receded, and at low tide the wreck was in just six feet of water. Both the survivors and the local people attempted to salvage property from the wreck. King John III of Portugal, demanded the return of the cargo, and King Henry VIII set up a Court of Star Chamber. Some of the evidence that was given at the court survives, but not the outcome. However manorial rights of the time would have included an assumed right to goods from wrecks on manorial lands and three prominent landowners were able to improve their status and their manors in the years that followed. William Godolphin was knighted and Godolphin house was considerably improved. St Aubyn of St Michael's Mount was a Justice of the Peace. John Milliton of Pengersick Castle became High Sheriff of Cornwall and Pengersick Castle was also improved around this time. There is some evidence that Henry VIII ordered that the salvaged cargo should be returned to Portugal, but much of it was missing.

== Discovery and protection ==
Despite the existence of the historical records, the actual position of the wreck was unknown. In the 1970s a copper ingot was recovered by a shellfish diver, but the significance of this find was not understood until 1981, when a copper ingot was found on the beach. A team was sent to investigate and discovered that the location matched the contemporary accounts.

The seabed at this location consists of rocky gullies, exposed to the full force of Atlantic surf. There is no sediment to protect historic material and there are flint pebbles which help to smash and grind artefacts. Unsurpisingly therefore, the timbers of the ship have not survived, nor have any ferrous artefacts. The site was designated on 15 February 1982 under the Protection of Wrecks Act and local diver Tony Randall was made licensee. As conservation in situ was impossible, a license to conduct a rescue operation of any surviving artefacts was granted, and the surviving remains were recovered. Examples of copper and silver ingots were acquired and analysed by the British Museum. There are public displays of recovered artefacts at Charlestown Heritage and Shipwreck Centre and at Pengersick Castle.

Following a report in May 2005 by English Heritage's archaeological diving contractor, that there was wreck material from St Anthony lying outside the protected area, and evidence that this material was vulnerable to interference the site was redesignated on 21 September 2006 under an emergency designation order. The centre of the designation area was moved to the South East and the radius was increased from 75 m (246 ft) to 150 m (490 ft).

After five years searching the gullies of Fishing Cove, material had been identified during the season of 2006 by Jason Roseveare. This proved that the designation order set back in 1983 did not cover the remains of St Anthony 1527. Subsequently, the Department for Culture, Media and Sport issued the new designation to prevent further study without licence.

== See also ==
- List of designations under the Protection of Wrecks Act
- Archaeology of shipwrecks
- Maritime archaeology
