= Santa Catarina do Monte Sinai =

16th century Portuguese carrack (ship)

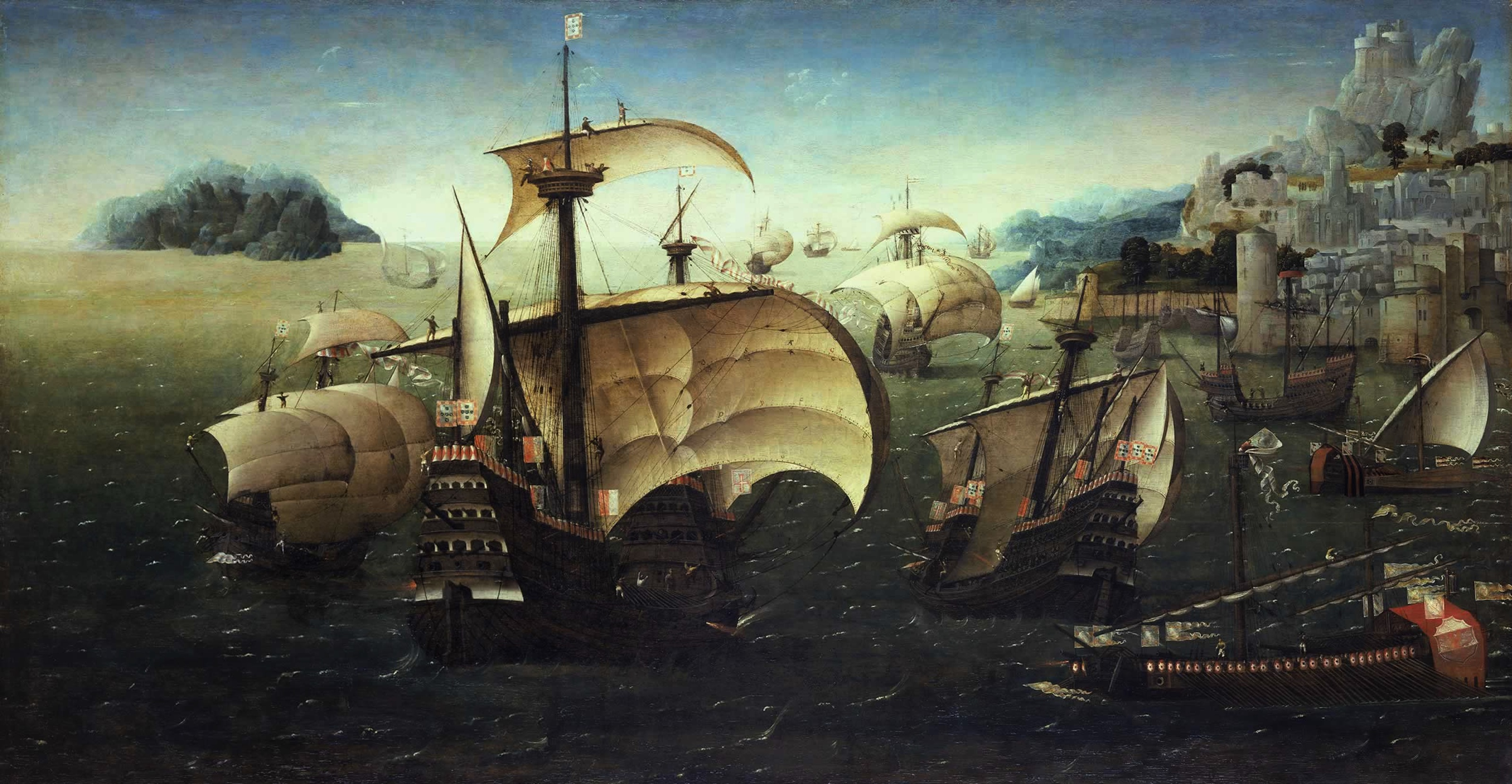
- The Portuguese carrack Santa Catarina do Monte Sinai and other Portuguese ships in a painting by Joachim Patinir.

History

Portugal
- Name: Santa Catarina do Monte Sinai
- Owner: Kingdom of Portugal
- Builder: Shipyard of Kochi, Portuguese India
- Laid down: 1512
- Launched: 1520
- Fate: Disappeared, April 1525, exact fate unknown

General characteristics
- Class & type: Carrack
- Displacement: 800 tons
- Length: 38 m
- Beam: 13 m
- Draught: 4–4.5 m
- Armament: 140 cannons, mostly light swivel guns mounted on the railings

Santa Catarina do Monte Sinai was a higher-castled Portuguese carrack with 140 guns, launched down in 1520 (800 t, length 38 m, width 13 m, draft 4–4.5 m). Built in Kochi, India around 1512 it had two square rig masts and is depicted on a painting attributed to Joachim Patinir.

In 1524, it was the flagship of Vasco da Gama, on his third voyage to India.

The ship disappeared somewhere along the route on the return journey to Portugal, which set out from India in April 1525. Its exact fate is uncertain. According to one rumor, D. Luis de Menezes, the dismissed captain of the India naval patrol and brother of the disgraced governor D. Duarte de Menezes (who was returning on another ship on that same fleet), engineered a mutiny and seized control of the ship, setting off with it for a career of piracy in the Indian Ocean. Another rumor relates that it was seized by French corsairs somewhere on the final Atlantic stretch between the Cape of Good Hope and Continental Portugal.

== Reports of the loss ==
The report of French seizure — which, if true, would be only the second time a Portuguese India ship was captured by enemy action (the first was in 1509) — was given by the 16th-century chronicler Gaspar Correia (who is not always reliable, and acknowledges this is hearsay) and also the 16th-century chronicler Francisco de Andrada. Both Correia and Andrada state that Luís de Menezes went on the Santa Catarina de Monte Sinai, and his brother, the ex-governor Duarte de Menezes, on a different ship, the São Jorge.

The chroniclers report that Duarte was under close watch, for fear he might order the ship to make a dart for Castile or France and avoid the justice awaiting him in Portugal. Reaching Mozambique Island, they heard news from outgoing ships of the next India armada that Duarte's affairs back in Portugal were not as dire as he feared. After rounding the Cape of Good Hope, Duarte ordered his ship to stop and replenish water stores at Table Bay (aguada de Saldanha), instructing his brother Luís to go on ahead, that he would catch up with him at Saint Helena. As it turns out, a violent tempest hit the South African coast around this time. When Duarte reached Saint Helena, there was no sign of his brother, and he assumed that Luís de Menezes's ship had perished in that tempest.

In 1527, John III dispatched a Portuguese ship under Diogo Botelho Pereira to scour the South African coast, from the Cape of Good Hope to Cape Correntes, in search for the remains of the ship of Luís de Menezes. Returning Portuguese ships had reported that they had seen from the distance cross-shaped fires along that stretch of coast, which they presumed were erected by shipwrecked Portuguese sailors. It was immediately assumed they were the remnant of Luís de Menezes's crew. However, after months of searching, Diogo Botelho found no trace of them.

The chroniclers Correia and Andrade report that in 1536, the Portuguese patrol captain Diogo de Silveira captured a French corsair off Portugal, who confessed that his brother (also a pirate) had seized Luís de Menezes's ship in the Atlantic a decade earlier. He reported that as the ship was struggling with leaks, Luís surrendered promptly to the French pirate, who after transferring its cargo, ordered the Portuguese ship burned at sea, with its crew (including Luís) still on board going down to their deaths.

This, according to Correia and Andrada, was the fate of the Santa Catarina de Monte Sinai. Although it seems unlikely such a well-armed ship would fall so easily, it is worthwhile remembering she was also heavily laden with India goods and battered by the tempest and reportedly springing leaks, making her dangerously unseaworthy and vulnerable at the moment of the French attack. This may explain why Luís surrendered her without a fight. (cf. the capture of other large Portuguese India ships, like the São Filipe by Sir Francis Drake in 1587, and the gigantic Madre de Deus by Sir John Burroughs in 1592.)

However, it is also possible that an error was made in the chronicles and the positions were reversed, that the outgoing governor Duarte went on the larger Santa Catarina, his brother Luís on the S. Jorge. In this case, it was the S. Jorge that was captured by the French, and the Santa Catarina sailed on. Correia reports that the first port of call of Duarte's ship was at Faro (in the Algarve). While docked there, Duarte got wind of the king's sour mood and the fate that awaited him in Lisbon, so he smuggled the greater part of his private treasure off the ship into the care of a female cousin in Faro.

Duarte subsequently seized control of the ship and, over the protests of the officers, forced them to drop him (and the remainder of his baggage) in Sesimbra (Duarte's seigneural estate). That evening, while the ship was anchored off Sesimbra, a gale arose and the ship was thrown and smashed on the shore (Correia says that as the gale was brewing, someone, on Duarte's orders, surreptitiously cut the anchor cables to deliberately set it adrift). All the treasure it was carrying was lost. Correia says Duarte's intention was "so that people would think all his wealth was lost...and he could show equal loss before the king and all mankind, with the loss of his brother and of so many of his people, with the king's loss" This could be another possible fate of the Santa Catarina.

In the aftermath, Duarte de Menezes was called before the royal court at Almeirim, and after a brief interview with the king John III of Portugal, was promptly placed under arrest. He was imprisoned in Torres Vedras, saved from execution by John III in the hope that Duarte could yet be made to confess where he had hidden his private treasure. Reportedly, teams of treasure-hunters, official and unofficial, scoured the beaches around Faro in the hope of finding where he had buried it.

== See also ==
- Flor de la Mar
- São João Baptista (galleon)
- Peter von Danzig
