= Cury =

Village in Cornwall, England

Coordinates: 50.0467°N 5.244°W

Cury: Cornish: Egloskuri
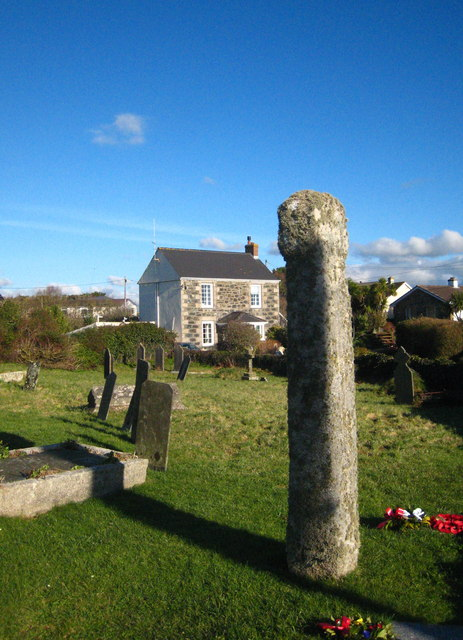
- The cross in the churchyard

- Location within Cornwall
- Population: 388 (Civil Parish, 2001); 431 (2011 Census)
- OS grid reference: SW678213
- Civil parish: Cury
- Unitary authority: Cornwall
- Ceremonial county: Cornwall
- Region: South West
- Country: England
- Sovereign state: United Kingdom
- Post town: Helston
- Postcode district: TR12
- Dialling code: 01326
- Police: Devon and Cornwall
- Fire: Cornwall
- Ambulance: South Western
- UK Parliament: St Ives

Cury (Cornish: Egloskuri) is a civil parish and village in southwest Cornwall, England, United Kingdom. It is situated approximately four miles (6 km) south of Helston on The Lizard peninsula. The parish is named for St Corentin and is recorded in the Domesday Book as Chori.

== Demographics and geography ==
Cury is a rural parish with a population of 388 at the 2001 census. It is bounded to the north by Mawgan-in-Meneage parish, to the west by Gunwalloe parish, and to the south by Mullion parish. Settlements include the church town, Cury; Cross Lanes; White Cross; and Nantithet. Cury lies within the Cornwall Area of Outstanding Natural Beauty (AONB).

== Church history ==
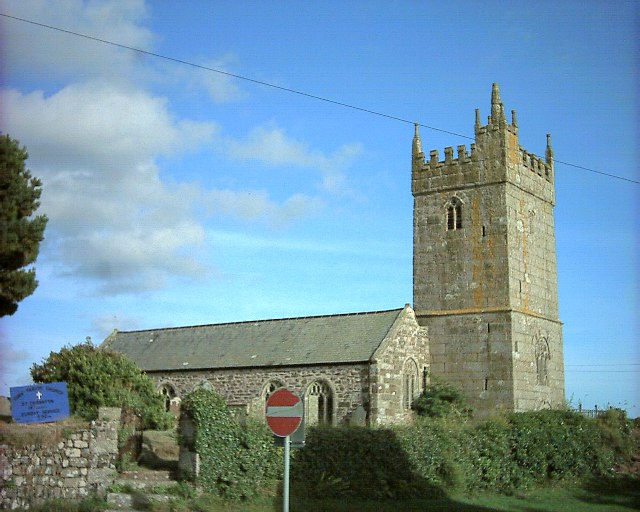
The Church of St Corentin, Cury

The parish church is dedicated to St Corentin. The building is cruciform and of the Norman period, but a north aisle was added in the 15th century. It was probably originally a manorial church of Winnianton, but became a chapelry of Breage in the 13th century.

There is a Cornish cross in the churchyard; it is probably the old churchyard cross but was found in a ditch nearby in 1849 and set up in its present position.

=== Sandys Wason ===
From 1905 to 1920 the parishes of Cury and Gunwalloe were served by Father Sandys Wason as perpetual curate. Father Wason was an Anglo-Catholic and unpopular with some parishioners; he wrote poems such as "Town" ("I met a clergymanly man, Prostrated in the Strand, He sucked a brace of oranges, One orange in each hand" is the first verse). He is notable for the controversy aroused by his ministry due to his practice of liturgical borrowing from the Roman Catholic Church and other aspects of it. He held open air services by the sea at Gunwalloe Church Cove on All Souls' Day and All Saints' Day. Though disciplined by successive bishops of Truro (Charles Stubbs and Winfrid Burrows) he persisted in his ways until a group of his opponents ejected him from the parish by force. Thereafter he moved to London and for a while owned a small publishing firm called Cope & Fenwick. His friend, the Rev. Bernard Walke, wrote of him: "I regard him as not only the most original but one of the most rare personalities I have ever known ... [with] a nature too shy and at the same time too intolerant of the commonplace to meet with the world's approval."

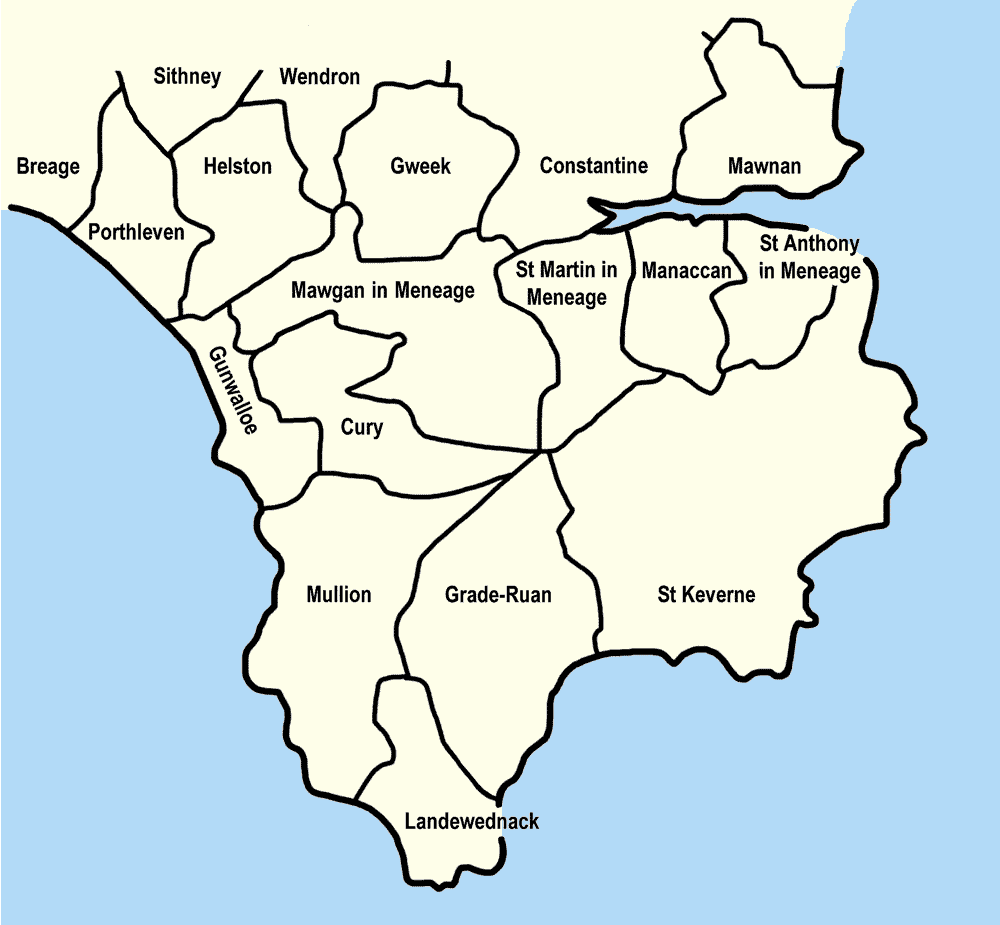
Cury in relation to neighbouring parishes

=== United Free Methodist chapel ===
A newly erected chapel was opened in May 1884 by the Rev. E. Boaden of Harrogate, ex-president of the denomination and a native of Cury.

== Bochym ==
In the early 18th century the ownership of Bochym passed to the Robinsons, following outbreaks of smallpox which killed the Bellott family; in 1711 Loveday Bellott, in 1717 her four sisters, and in 1719 the last survivor of the family, Bridget.

Stephen and Richard Davey were "adventurers" in the development of Cornish mines, during the boom period. They acquired an ancient manor house and estate at Bochym in Cury. Richard Davey's nephew, Joshua Sydney Davey (1842–1909), son of Stephen, inherited his estate at Bochym.
