= Nantithet =

Hamlet in Cornwall, England

Coordinates: 50.056°N 5.240°W

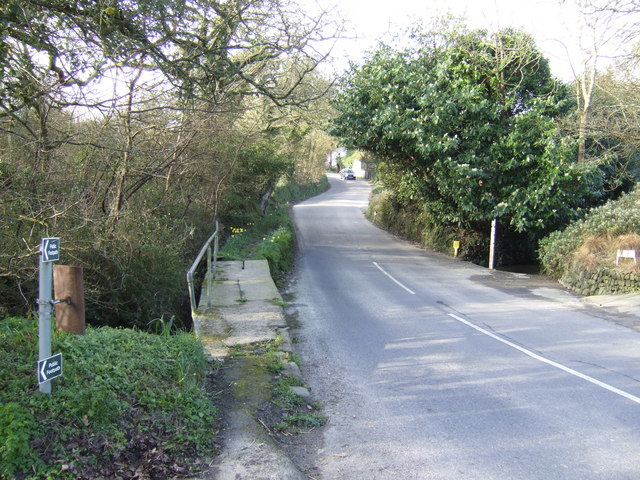
- Road bridge at Nantithet

- Location within Cornwall
- OS grid reference: SW682224
- Civil parish: Cury
- Unitary authority: Cornwall
- Ceremonial county: Cornwall
- Region: South West
- Country: England
- Sovereign state: United Kingdom

Nantithet is a hamlet near Cury in west Cornwall, England.
