= Gunwalloe =

Civil parish in Cornwall, England

Gunwalloe: Cornish: Gwynnwalow
- Location within Cornwall
- Population: 219 (2011)
- Civil parish: Gunwalloe
- Unitary authority: Cornwall
- Ceremonial county: Cornwall
- Region: South West
- Country: England
- Sovereign state: United Kingdom
- Police: Devon and Cornwall
- Fire: Cornwall
- Ambulance: South Western
- UK Parliament: St Ives

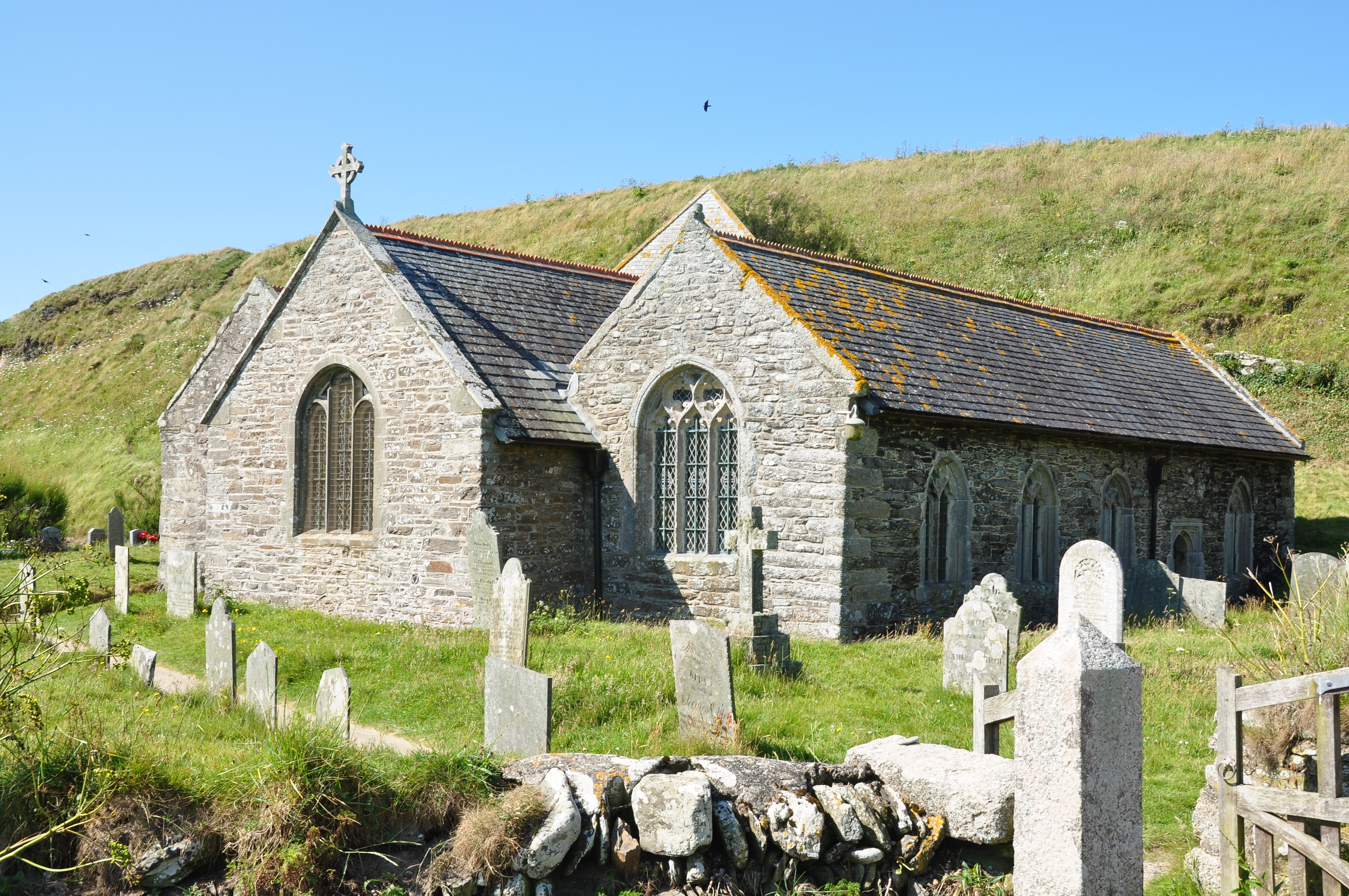
Gunwalloe parish church

Gunwalloe (/ɡʌnˈwɒləʊ/ Cornish: Pluw Wynnwalow) is a coastal civil parish in Cornwall, England, United Kingdom. It is situated on the Lizard Peninsula three miles (4.8 km) south of Helston and partly contains The Loe, the largest natural freshwater lake in Cornwall. The parish population including Berepper at the 2011 census was 219. The hamlets in the parish are Chyanvounder, Berepper and Chyvarloe. To the east are the Halzephron cliffs (the site of many graves of shipwrecked sailors and soldiers) and further east the parish church.

Gunwalloe lies within the Cornwall National Landscape (AONB). Almost a third of Cornwall has AONB designation, with the same status and protection as a National Park.

== History ==
Gunwalloe is considered to be the first entry for Cornwall in the Domesday Book, given that the King's manor of Winnianton is the first listing, which at the time of writing was the head manor in the hundred of Kerrier. The parish church was originally a manorial church of this manor but in the 13th century it became a chapelry of Breage. The Church of Saint Winwaloe was rebuilt in the 14th to 15th century but the tower (a separate older building which belonged to the earlier church) is perhaps 13th century.

Gunwalloe's pilchard seine fishery was auctioned on 19 January 1884 and bought for £53 by Mr James Trehair. Items for sale included the Good Templar stop seine, a tuck seine, a seine boat, a cock boat, anchors, warps, ropes and tarpaulins.

Gunwalloe village once belonged to the family of Penrose (of Penrose, Cornwall) but was sold; some property was sold to sitting tenants and other property to the National Trust.

== National and archaeological significance ==
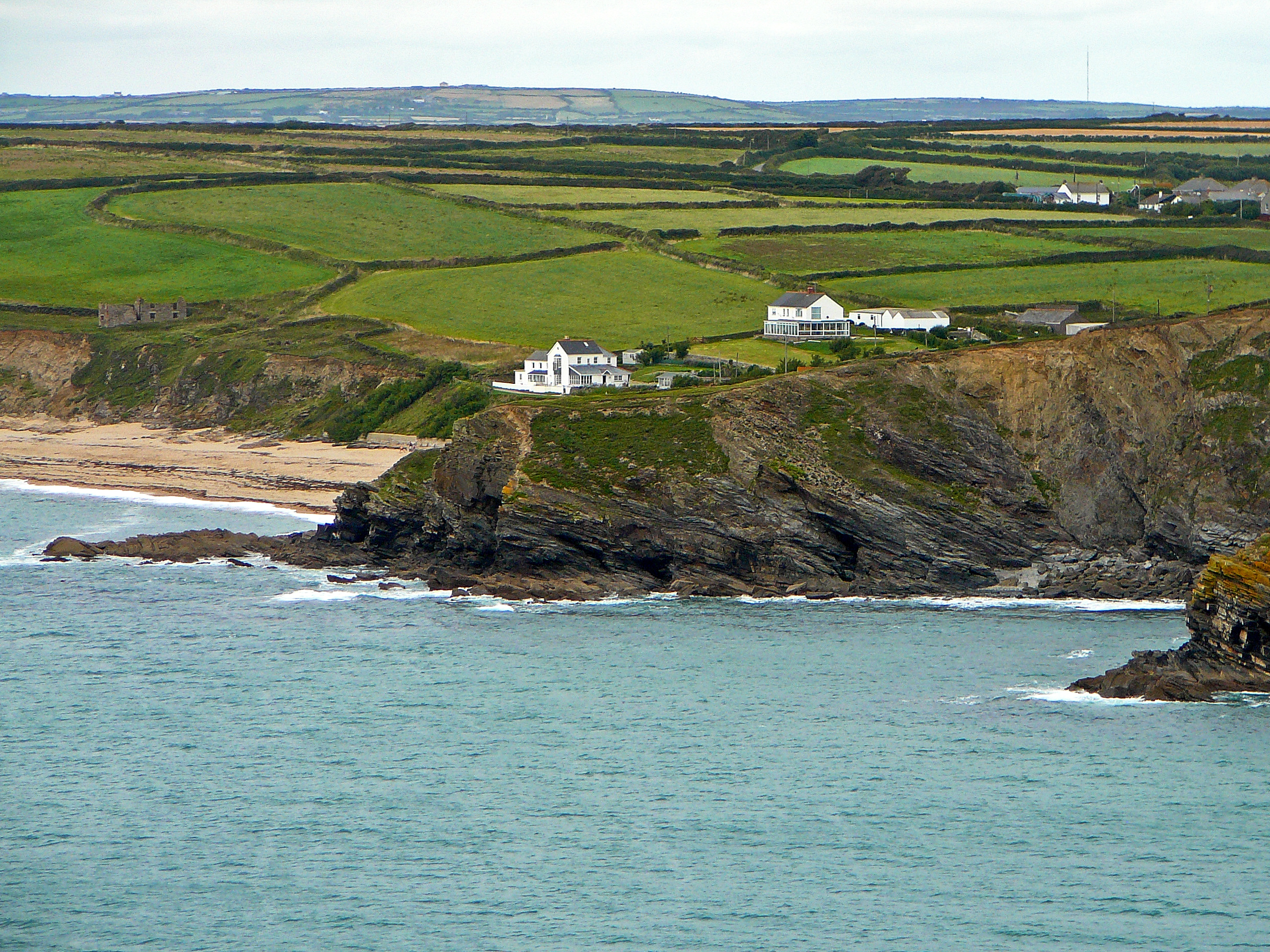
Halzephron

Gunwalloe is home to a number of listed buildings, such as the Church of Saint Winwaloe and Rose Cottage. The wreck of what is thought to be a seventeenth-century armed cargo vessel, identified as a British East Indiaman lies off Fishing Cove, one of Gunwalloe's three major beaches. The ship was supposedly on her return journey laden with a valuable cargo of spices, indigo, drugs, Indian piece goods and 100 long tons (100 t) of pepper, when she was stranded near Loe Bar. Historical evidence indicates that salvage took place soon after the wrecking.}

Another wreck in 1525, that of the St Antony, carrying the King of Portugal's bullion, plate and silver. 45 sailors survived the wreck and for two days were helped by local people to salvage the treasure. Whereupon, three local magistrates attacked them and carried off more than £10,000 worth of goods. A legal battle ensued in the Court of Star Chamber.

In late 2010, an early medieval site was excavated at Gunwalloe by a team of archaeologists from Exeter University and the National Trust.

== Recreation ==
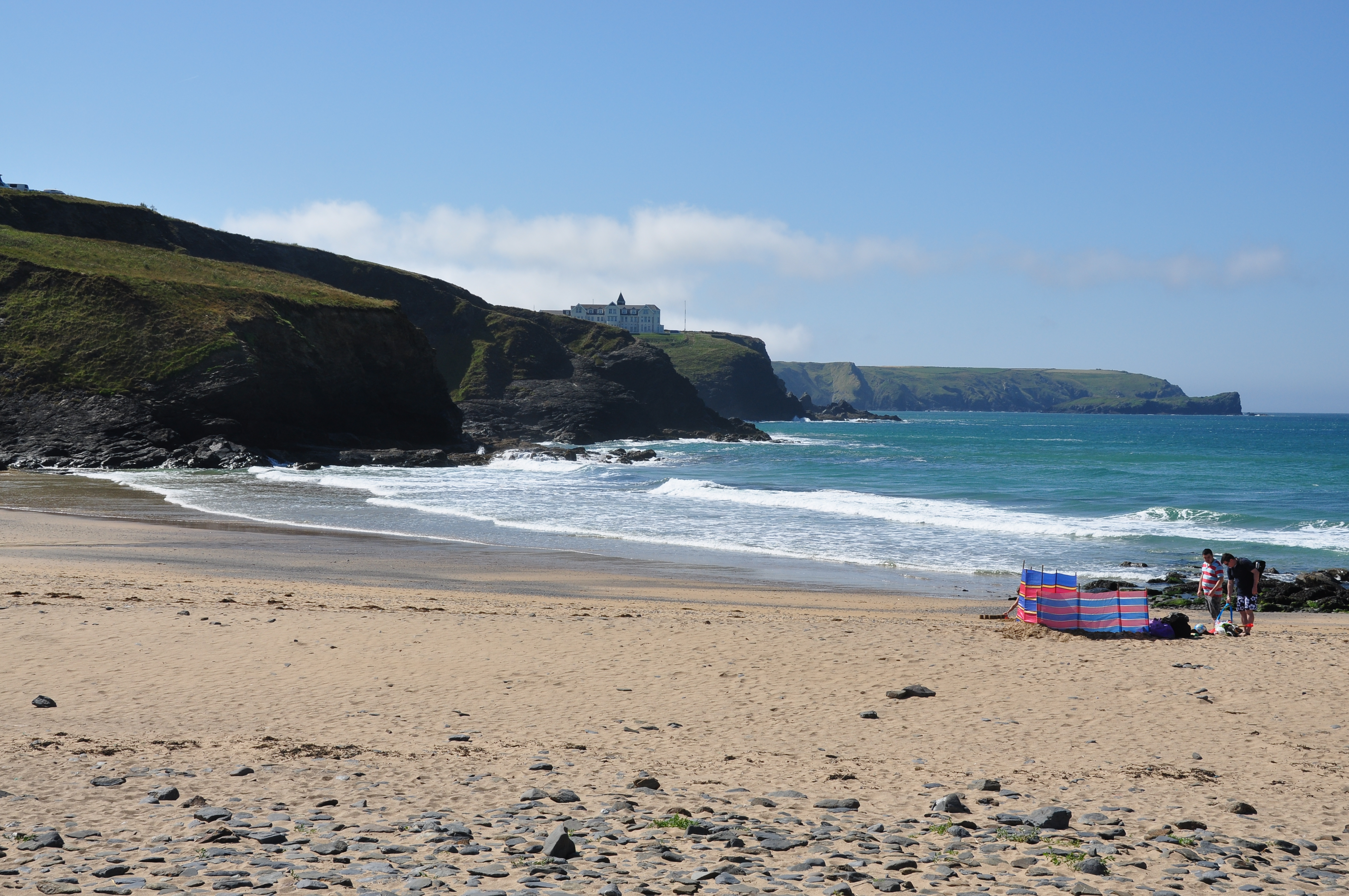
Gunwalloe Church Cove

The Halzephron Inn has a history of smuggling and is close to Gunwalloe Cove. The name Halzephron means "hell's cliff". The inn was built in 1468 and parts of it have been constructed with timber salvaged from shipwrecks on the coast.

Gunwalloe beach is used by naturists. (Note: Location of Gunwalloe naturist beach 50°03′46″N 5°17′13″W)

=== Deaths ===
Church Cove, Gunwalloe, is noted for strong currents.

- In 1951 Vyvyan Adams, a British Conservative Party politician, drowned while swimming at Church Cove.

== See also ==
- St Anthony (ship) (wrecked here)

== References and notes ==
- The Cornish church guide. Truro: Oscar Blackford. 1925.
- Henderson, Charles (1964). The Cornish Church Guide and Parochial History of Cornwall. D. Bradford.
- Pevsner, Nikolaus; Radcliffe, Enid (1970). Cornwall. Penguin. ISBN 978-0-14-071001-4.
