= Name of Brazil =

1519 map of the coast of Brazil, showing the harvesting of brazilwood

The name Brazil is a shortened form of Terra do Brasil ("Land of Brazil"), a reference to the brazilwood tree. The name was given in the early 16th century to the territories leased to the merchant consortium led by Fernão de Loronha, to exploit brazilwood for the production of wood dyes for the European textile industry.

The term for the brazilwood tree in Portuguese, pau-brasil, is formed by pau ("wood") and brasa ("ember"), the latter referring to the vivid red dye that can be extracted from the tree. The word brasa is formed from Old French brese ("ember, glowing charcoal").

== Native names ==
According to tradition, before colonisation, the native name of the land was the one given by the local indigenous peoples, Pindorama (Tupi for "Land of the Palms"). However, exact translation of "Land of Palms" would be Pindotetama or Pindoretama in the Tupi language, suggesting Pindorama may be a later corruption of the original term.Pindorama may have referred merely to the coastal regions, as the term Tapuiretama or Tapuitetama ("Land of the Enemy") was used by the Tupi to refer to the interior, then mostly inhabited by Tapuya peoples.

== Early European names ==
The land of what became Brazil was first called Ilha de Vera Cruz ("Island of the True Cross") by the Portuguese captain Pedro Álvares Cabral upon the Portuguese discovery of the land in 1500, probably in honor of the Feast of the Cross (3 May on the liturgical calendar). This name is found in two letters, one written by Pero Vaz de Caminha, another by Mestre João Faras, both written during Cabral's landing and dispatched to Lisbon by courier (either André Gonçalves or Gaspar de Lemos, chronicles conflict).

Upon the courier's arrival in Lisbon, it was quickly renamed Terra de Santa Cruz ("Land of the Holy Cross"), which became its official name in Portuguese records (hugging the coast on his return trip, the courier must have realized that Brazil was clearly not an island). Italian merchants in Lisbon, who interviewed the returning crews in 1501, recorded its name as the Terra dos Papagaios ("Land of Parrots").

The Florentine navigator Amerigo Vespucci joined the follow-up Portuguese expedition in 1501 to map the coast of Brazil. Shortly upon his return to Lisbon, Vespucci authored a famous letter to his former employer Lorenzo di Pierfrancesco de' Medici characterizing the Brazilian landmass as a continent and calling it a "New World". Vespucci's letter, first printed c. 1503 under the title Mundus Novus, became a publishing sensation in Europe.

In 1507, Vespucci's letters were reprinted in the volume Cosmographiae Introductio put out by a German academy, which contains the famous map by Martin Waldseemüller with the Brazilian landmass designated by the name America. The accompanying text, written by his assistant Matthias Ringmann, notes: "I do not see what right any one would have to object to calling this part, after Americus who discovered it and who is a man of intelligence".

In a similar spirit, a map by the Genoese cartographer Visconte Maggiolo, dated 1504, Brazil appears designated as Tera de Gonsalvo Coigo vocatur Santa Croxe ("Land of Gonçalo Coelho called Santa Cruz"), a reference to Gonçalo Coelho, presumed to be the captain of the aforementioned 1501 mapping expedition (and certainly of its 1503-04 follow-up).

== Shift to Brazil ==
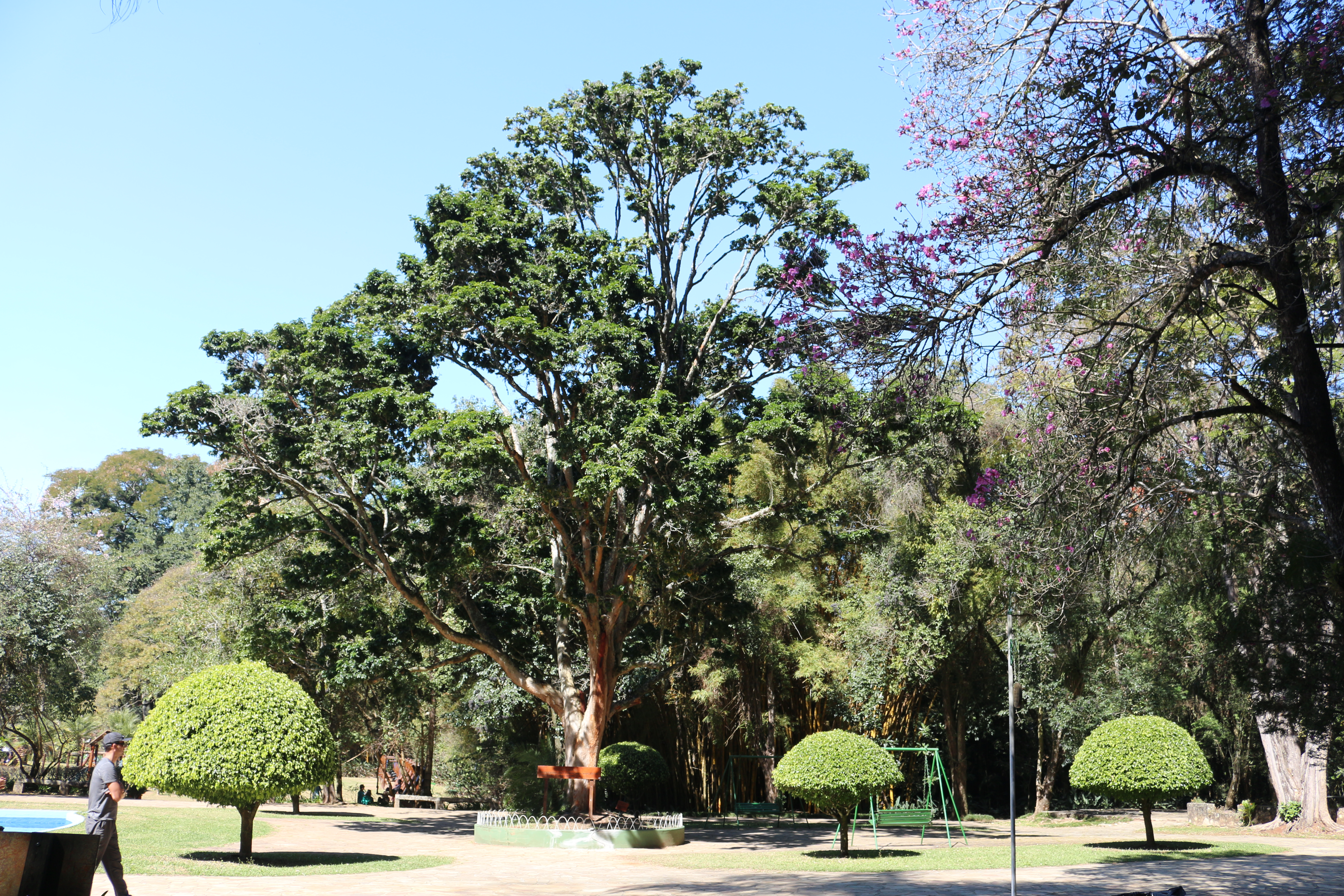
Brazilwood tree in a park in São Lourenço, Minas Gerais

From 1502 to 1512, the Portuguese claim on Brazil was leased by the crown to a Lisbon merchant consortium led by Fernão de Loronha for commercial exploitation. Loronha set up an extensive enterprise along the coast focusing on the harvesting of brazilwood. A dyewood that produces a deep red dye, reminiscent of the color of glowing embers, brazilwood was much in demand by the European cloth industry and previously had to be imported from India at great expense. Loronha is estimated to have harvested some 20,000 quintals of brazilwood on the Brazilian coast by 1506. By the 1510s, French interlopers from the Atlantic clothmaking ports of Normandy and Brittany began to also routinely visit the Brazilian coast to do their own (illegal) brazilwood harvesting.

It was during Loronha's tenure that the name began to transition to Terra do Brasil ("Land of Brazil") and its inhabitants to Brasileiros. Although some commentators have alleged that Loronha, as a New Christian (a converted Jew), might have been reluctant to refer to it after the Christian cross, the truth is probably more mundane. It was rather common for 15th- and 16th-century Portuguese to refer to distant lands by their commercial product rather than their proper name, e.g. Madeira island and the series of coasts of West Africa (Melegueta Coast, Ivory Coast, Gold Coast, Slave Coast), etc. Brazil simply followed that pattern. Brazilwood harvesting was doubtlessly the principal and often sole objective of European visitors to Brazil in the early part of the 16th century.

The first hint of the new name is found in the Cantino planisphere (1502), which draws extensively on the 1501 mapping expedition. The label Rio D Brasil ("River of Brazil") is given near Porto Seguro, just below the São Francisco River, almost certainly an indicator of a river where ample brazilwood could be found on its shores. That label is repeated on subsequent maps (e.g. Canerio map of 1505).

The generalization from that river to the land as a whole followed soon enough. Already Duarte Pacheco Pereira, in his Esmeraldo de Situ Orbis (c. 1506-09), refers to the entire coast as the terra do Brasil daleem do mar Ociano ("land of Brazil beyond the Ocean sea"). The term is also found in a letter, dated April 1, 1512, from Afonso de Albuquerque to the king, referring to a map of a Javanese maritime pilot, which contained a depiction of the "terra do brasyll". The 1516 map of Martin Waldseemüller drops his earlier America designation and refers to it now as Brasilia sive Terra Papagalli ("Brasilia, or the Land of Parrots"). The first "official" use of the term appears in 1516, when King Manuel I of Portugal invested the Portuguese captain Cristóvão Jacques as governador das partes do Brasil ("governor of the parts of Brazil"), and again in 1530, when King John III designated Martim Afonso de Sousa as captain of the armada "which I send to the land of Brazil"

The Santa Cruz ("Holy Cross") name did not disappear altogether. In the 1527 map of the Visconte Maggiolo it re-appears in the dual label Terre Sante Crusis de lo Brasil e del Portugal ("Land of the Holy Cross of Brazil and of Portugal"). Years later, in 1552, the chronicler João de Barros grumbled at the change in name. Barros notes how, before leaving in 1500, Pedro Álvares Cabral erected a huge wooden cross as the marker of the land, but that later, because brazilwood was brought from this land, "this name (Brazil) became stuck in the mouth of the people, and the name Santa Cruz was lost, as if the name of some wood which tinctured cloths was more important than that wood which has tinctured all the Sacraments by which we were saved, by the blood of Jesus Christ, which was spilled upon it." Barros goes on to moan that he can do little but remind his readers of the solemnity of the original name and urge them to use it lest, on Judgment Day, "they be accused of being worshipers of brazilwood" rather than worshipers of the Holy Cross. "For the honor of such a great land let us call it a province, and say the 'Province of Holy Cross', which sounds better among the prudent than 'Brazil', which was placed vulgarly without consideration and is an unfit name for these properties of the royal crown".

Other Portuguese chroniclers confirm this reason for the transition, e.g. Fernão Lopes de Castanheda (c. 1554) notes that Cabral "named it the land of Holy Cross, and that later this name was lost and remained that of Brasil, for love of brazilwood" and Damião de Góis (1566) notes Cabral "placed the name Holy Cross, which is now, (erroneously) called Brazil, because of the red wood that comes from it, which they call Brazil."

Barros's call was taken up by Pedro Magalhães Gandavo, who titled his 1576 history of "Santa Cruz, vulgarly called Brazil". Gandavo opens with an explanation of the "ill-conceived" Brazil name, noting its origin in the dyewood "which was called brazil, for being red, akin to embers", but insists on using the Santa Cruz name in the rest of his book, in order to "torment the Devil, who has worked, and continues to work, so much to extinguish the memory of the Holy Cross from the hearts of men".

== Demonym ==
The connection to the brazilwood harvest is also found in the demonym for the country. In the Portuguese language, an inhabitant of Brazil is referred to as a Brasileiro. But the common rules of the language reserve the suffix -eiro to denote occupations, rather than inhabitants (which are usually given the suffix -ano). The English equivalent is the suffix -er for occupations (e.g. baker, shoemaker) and the suffix -an for demonyms (e.g. Indian, American). If this rule were followed, an inhabitant of Brazil should have been known (in Portuguese) as a Brasiliano. But uniquely among Portuguese demonyms, they are instead referred to as a Brasileiro, an occupation. That too stemmed from Loronha's time, when a brasileiro was a reference to a "brazilwood cutter", a job invariably undertaken by the Tupi natives on the coast. The name of the occupation was simply extended to refer to all the inhabitants of the country.

== The island of Brasil ==
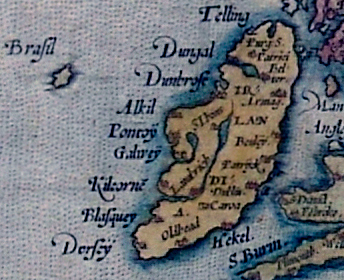
An island called "Brasil" close to Ireland on a 1572 map

While the brazilwood root of Brazil is generally accepted, it has been occasionally challenged. Among the alternative hypotheses is that it is named after the legendary island of Brasil. Many 14th-century nautical maps denoted a phantom island called insula brasil in the north Atlantic Ocean, usually circular in shape and located just southwest of Ireland. Although its source is uncertain, it is sometimes believed this brasil stems from Celtic word bress, which means "to bless", and that the island was named Hy-Brasil, or "Island of the Blessed". Such an island might have been spoken of in legendary old Irish immrama, then filtered into seafarer's tales, before being incorporated into maps by Italian cartographers, beginning with the 1325-30 portolan chart of Angelino Dalorto.

It is not, however, the only use of brasil to denote an Atlantic island. For example, the 1351 Medici Atlas denotes two islands of brasil, one placed traditionally off Ireland, and the other in the Azores archipelago, in the location of Terceira Island. The brasil in this case could be a reference either to the island's volcanic complex, or to dragon's blood, a valuable red resin dye found on that island. Brasil is also used to designate Aruba in the Cantino planisphere.

== See also ==
- List of Brazil state name etymologies
- History of Brazil
- Culture of Brazil
- Brazil

== Bibliography ==
- Aldrich, Robert (2007). The Age of Empires. New York: Thames & Hudson Inc.
