= Monte Pascoal =

Mountain in Bahia, Brazil

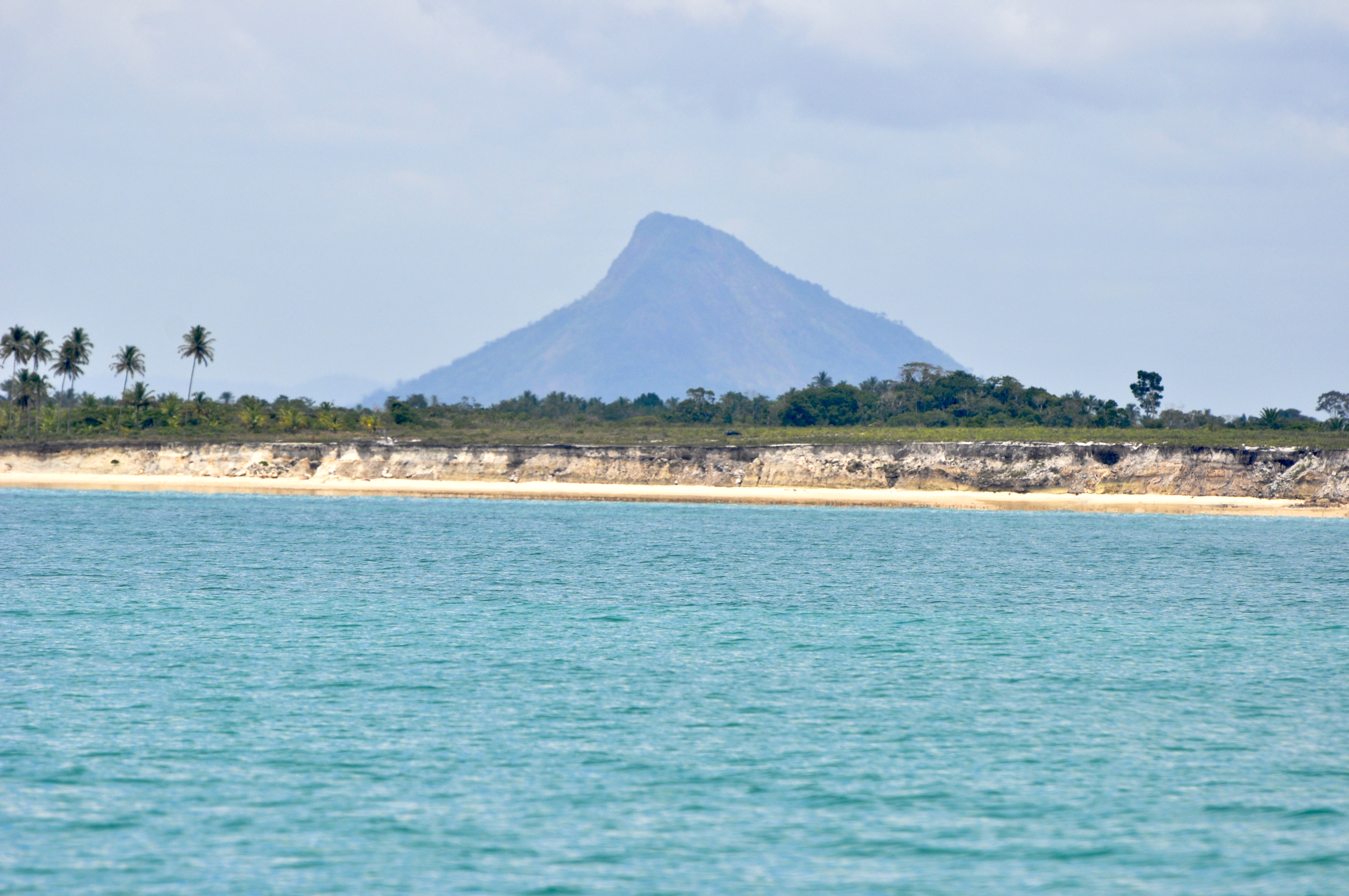
- Monte Pascoal as seen from the sea

Highest point
- Elevation: 586 m (1,923 ft)
- Coordinates: 16°53′45″S 39°24′28″W

Naming
- English translation: The Mount of Easter

Geography
- Location within Brazil

Monte Pascoal is a 586-meter mountain to the south of the city of Porto Seguro, in the state of Bahia, Brazil. According to historians, it was the first part of land viewed by Portuguese explorer Pedro Álvares Cabral, allegedly the first European to arrive in Brazil, on April 22, 1500.

The identification of the mountain as the first terrain officially saw by the Portuguese is based on the interpretation of the letter of Pero Vaz de Caminha and the historical tradition consolidated since the colonial period.

The area surrounding Monte Pascoal is the traditional territory of the Pataxó people and integrates, since 1961, the Monte Pascoal National Park. The park is recognized for its ecological, historical and cultural significance to Brazil: it is one of the locations where the old growth Atlantic Forest (Mata Atlântica) remains, and has been preserved.

== Etymology ==
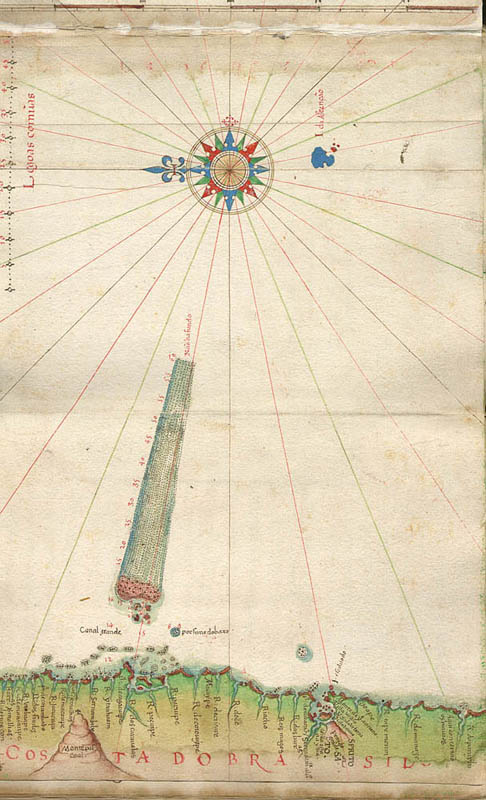
1500s map of the Brazilian coast. At the bottom, Monte Pascoal is visible.

According to the letter of Pero Vaz de Caminha, the captain of the fleet, Pedro Álvares Cabral, named the mountain Monte Pascoal (The Mount of Easter) as a consequence of the nearby date of Easter of that year in relation to the mountain's sighting.

Portuguese: Neste mesmo dia, a horas de véspera, houvemos vista de terra! A saber, primeiramente de um grande monte, muito alto e redondo; e de outras serras mais baixas ao sul dele; e de terra chã, com grandes arvoredos; ao qual monte alto o capitão pôs o nome de O Monte Pascoal (monte da Páscoa) e à terra A Terra de Vera Cruz!

[In this same day, on the vespers, we saw land! Firstly, a great mount, very tall and round; and another lower mountains at his south; and low lands, with large groves; to the great mount, the captain called it the Mount of Easter and the land Land of the True Cross!]

— Pero Vaz de Caminha, Letter of Pero Vaz de Caminha

== History ==
=== Indigenous people ===
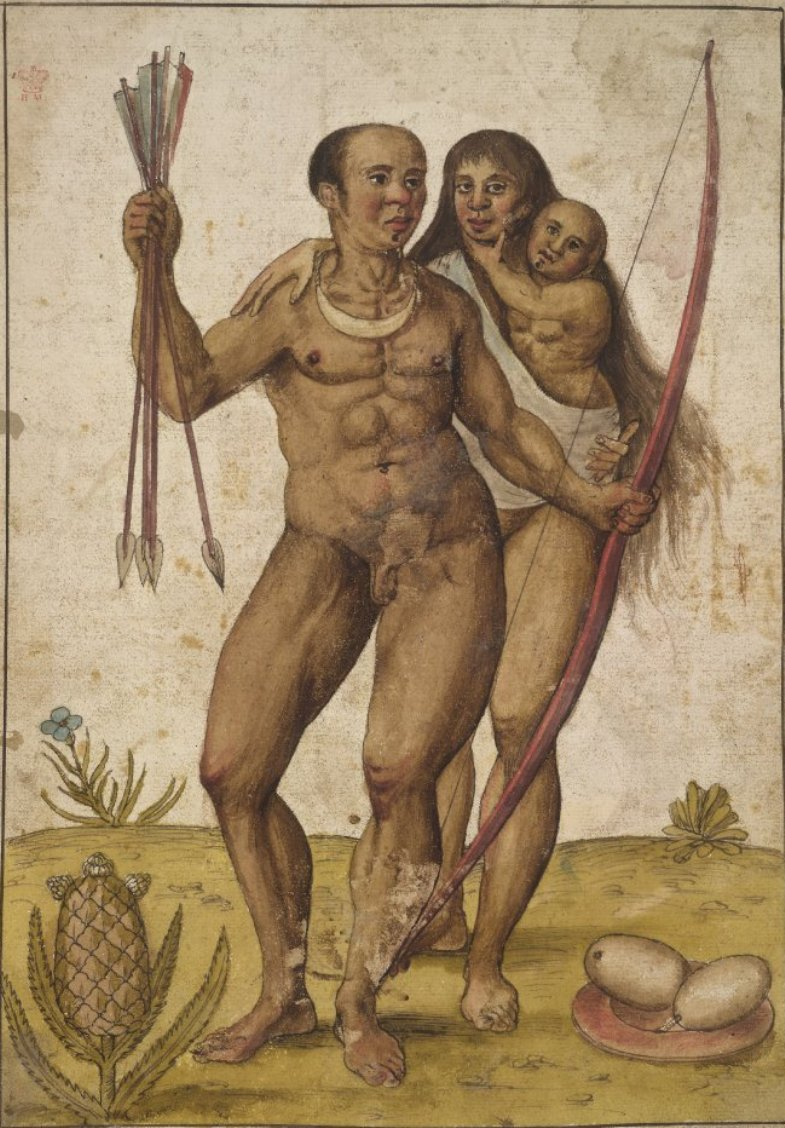
Tupinambá family, John White (1500s)

Long before the arrival of the Europeans, the region of today's Monte Pascoal was inhabited by members of the Tupi people and later by the Pataxó. The Pataxó still inhabit the regions of Monte Pascoal, possessing spiritual and cultural links with the area.

Ethno-historical records confirm practices of hunting, gathering, gardening and florest management in the region since before the Portuguese colonization.

=== Cabral and the Portuguese ===
Caminha describes a "very round and tall" elevation that has been usually interpreted as Monte Pascoal. The reports of chroniclers and historians like Jaime Cortesão and Capistrano de Abreu support this identification, even if there's a acknowledgement of the poor cartography of the Portuguese writings of the 1500s.

=== Historical discussions ===
A section of historical research argues that Vicente Yáñez Pinzón arrived in the American continent before Cabral near the coast of today's Pernambuco on January, 1500. This discussion doesn't invalidate the symbolic weight of the mountain in the production of narratives about the Discovery, but reframes the episode in the broader context of the Age of Discovery.

== Geography ==
Monte Pascoal is highlighted as an isolated elevated region at Bahia's coastline, easily visible from the sea and covered by a thick rainforest. The mountain is located approximately 62 km south of Porto Seguro, being part of a transition between the coastline environments, sandbank vegetation (restingas), sandy plateaus and areas of Atlantic Forest.

Recent studies also classify the region as a high-priority area for the Atlantic Forest biological conservation efforts for its high degree of endemism and dense ecological web.

== Culture and symbolism ==
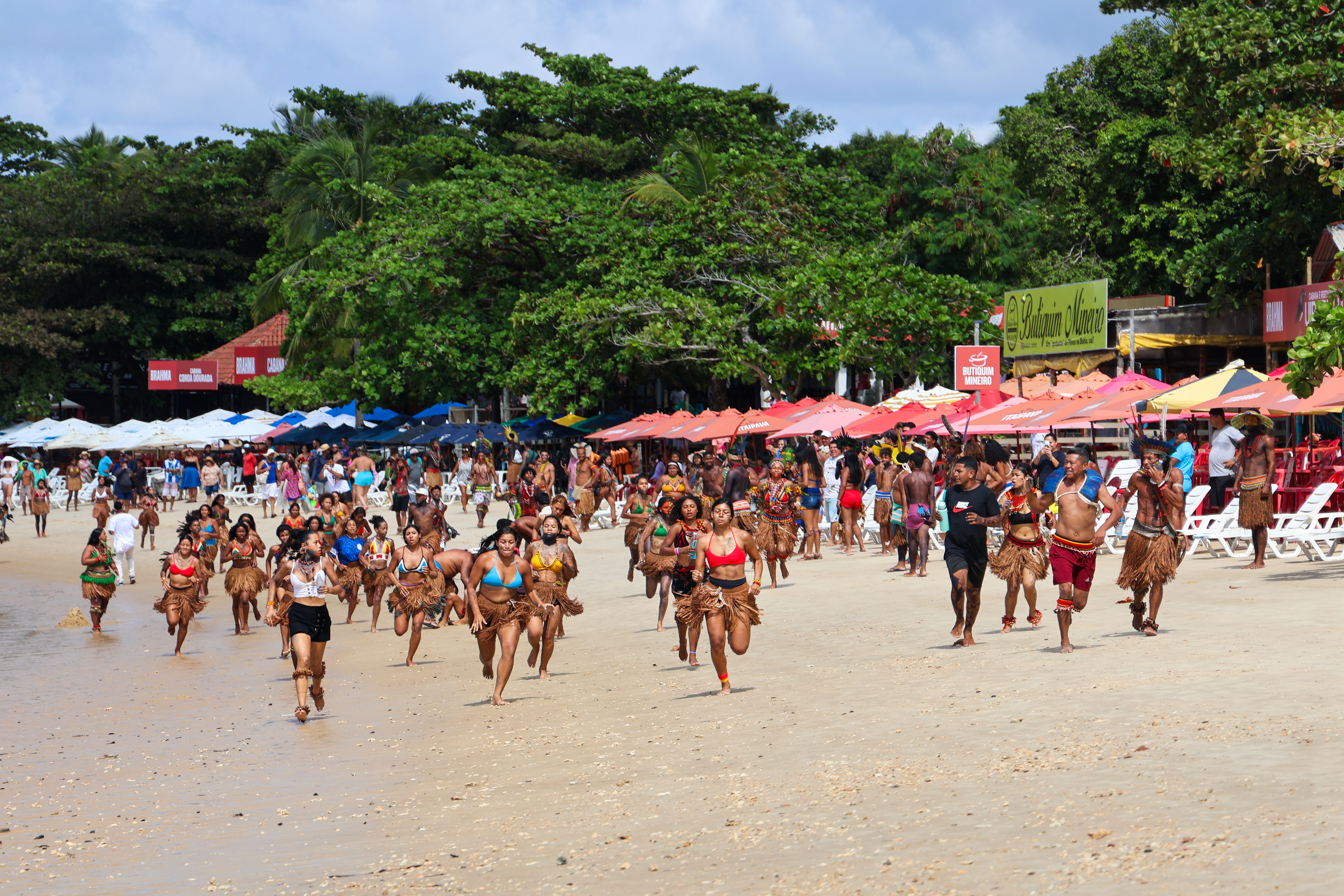
Pataxó athletes in the Pataxó Indigenous Games (2025)

To the Pataxó people, the mountain is a mark of identity, place of memory and ritual space.

In colonial Brazil cartography and iconography, Monte Pascoal was frequently present as a symbol of the start of the portuguese presence in Brazilian territory.

== Monte Pascoal National Park ==
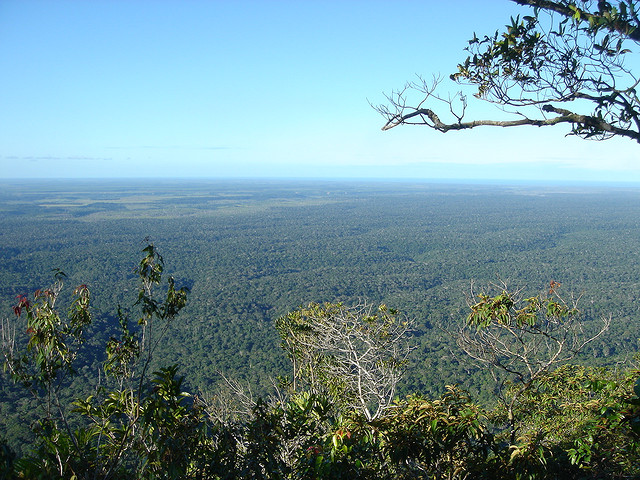
View from the top of Monte Pascoal, inside Monte Pascoal National Park.

The Parque Nacional e Histórico do Monte Pascoal (National and Historical Monte Pascoal Park or simply Monte Pascoal National Park) was created by the decree no. 242, of 29 November 1961, with an initial area of 22,500 ha. The unity is part of the Central Atlantic Forest Ecological Corridor and houses significant areas of original forest and historical sites of colonial Brazil. The facility's management is shared with the Pataxó community. The Pataxó work in projects in the areas of tourism, environmental care and patrimonial education.

Scholarly studies identify the presence of endangered species in the park's region, highlighting the facility's importance on conserving Atlantic forest biodiversity.

The park can be accessed by the BR-101 after the authorization of the local indigenous leadership. The activities offered range from trails, viewpoints, local fauna observation to ethno-tourism activities developed by the Pataxó community.

== See also ==
- Monte Pascoal National Park
- Ilha de Vera Cruz
- Discovery of Brazil
- Name of Brazil
- Cabo de Santo Agostinho (landform)
