= João Faras =

15th/16th-century Portuguese astronomer and physician

João Faras, better known simply as Mestre João ("Master John"), was an astrologer, astronomer, physician and surgeon of King Manuel I of Portugal who accompanied Pedro Álvares Cabral in the discovery of Brazil in 1500, and wrote a famous letter identifying the Southern Cross constellation.

== Background ==
The celebrated 1500 letter of Mestre João Faras was discovered in the Portuguese royal archives by the historian Francisco Adolfo de Varnhagen, and published for the first time in 1843.

Despite extensive research, the figure of Mestre João Faras remains elusive. In his 1500 letter, Mestre João identifies himself simply as a bacherel of arts and medicine ('bachelor' was a general term for someone with formal learning) and a personal physician and surgeon of the King Manuel I of Portugal.

Besides the 1500 letter, the only other concrete clue about Mestre João's existence is an (unpublished) manuscript translation of Pomponius Mela's De Situ Orbis from Latin into imperfect Castilian. He may also have gone by the name 'Johannes Emeneslau'.

On account of his poor command of Portuguese and preference for Spanish (Castilian), Mestre João Faras is generally believed to have been originally one of the existing nationalities in what would become Spain (whether he was Castilian, Galician or Aragonese has been alternatively proposed). He was almost certainly a Sephardi Jew. He probably fled Spain for Portugal after the 1492 Alhambra decrees, but ended up converting after 1496, to enter the service of King Manuel I of Portugal.

Recent research has traced at least two originally Spanish Jews who could plausibly fit his profile: one, a certain Juan Faraz, a native of Seville, another, a "Mestre Joam" (original surname and town not given), who settled in northern Portugal and took up the name João da Paz.

== Voyage and mission ==
Mestre João Faras joined the 2nd Portuguese India Armada of thirteen ships, commanded by Pedro Álvares Cabral, which left Lisbon in March 1500, destined for Calicut, India. It is unknown on which ship he sailed, although it has been conjectured (on account of his complaint about it being "small" with insufficient space) to be either the Anunciada commanded by Nuno Leitão da Cunha or the São Pedro commanded by Pero de Ataíde.

The purpose of his joining the expedition seemed to have been purely scientific, that is, to assist the future development of navigational science. His predecessor, Mestre José Vizinho, was sent to Guinea back in 1485 to test measurements of solar altitudes. Mestre João Faras was probably sent by the king with a similar intent, to test out new astronomical instruments and tables. It is known that Mestre João Faras brought along a new nautical astrolabe and what he characterised as new Arab astronomical nautical staves (cross-staff?) for experimentation. He was almost certainly furnished with Abraham Zacuto's new tables as well.

Mestre João Faras was probably specifically charged to find a way of determining the position of the ship by the stars in the Southern Hemisphere, a difficulty which had not yet been overcome. Since the time of Prince Henry the Navigator, "compass error" (the exact deviation of the magnetic north from the true north) could be corrected in the northern hemisphere by recourse to the position of northern Pole Star (observed on board via the quadrant), thus allowing navigators to determine the correct position of the ship. But the Pole Star disappeared below the horizon as the equator was crossed, rendering this method useless in the southern hemisphere. It was hoped that an equivalent South Pole Star might be found.

An alternative method was to take recourse to the position of the Sun at noon. This had been suggested since at least the 1470s, but only became a reality with the publication of the Almanach perpetuum of Abraham Zacuto in 1496, with its tables of solar declination. As the Sun could not be observed directly by the quadrant, Portuguese navigators brought on board their ships land-based astrolabes (which allows the measuring of the Sun's height without looking directly at it). Unfortunately, astrolabe readings required stability which is not possible at sea, so new small hand-held nautical astrolabes were being introduced at this time.

This method had still not been perfected. In 1497, Vasco da Gama took Zacuto's tables and the astrolabe with him on his maiden trip to India, but was dissatisfied with the results. Upon his arrival at the Bay of St. Helena in November 1497, da Gama disembarked to take readings on land because he did not trust the readings of the new nautical astrolabe at sea. Master João Faras made much the same complaint about his on-board readings in his letter, claiming that the rocking of the ship put his readings off by a whole four or five degrees.

(In his letter, Mestre João hints the pilots on board had engaged him in a friendly charting competition, the pilots betting they could find the Cape of Good Hope more accurately by compass and chart alone than Mestre João could with his astrolabe.)

== In Brazil ==
On 22 April 1500, Cabral's armada sighted the land coast of Brazil, and anchored a couple of days later at Cabrália Bay (just north of Porto Seguro, Bahia), where they were met by local Tupiniquim Indians.

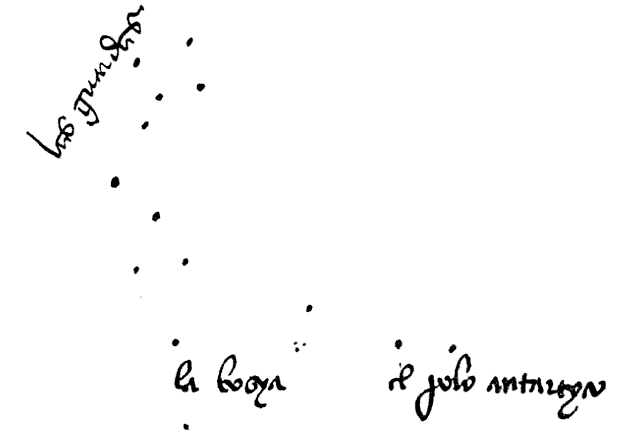
Sketch of the southern celestial sky by Mestre João Faras, from his letter of May 1, 1500.

Master João Faras left the ships on 27 April, and with the assistance of the pilots Afonso Lopes and Pedro Escobar, set up a large wooden astrolabe on the beach (more reliable than the tin ones used aboard ship) with the objective of taking the altitude of the Sun at mid-day and determine their position. The latitude measure calculated by Faras on 27 April was 17° S (Cabralia Bay is actually at 16° 21' S, thus his error was less than 40').

Mestre João Faras assumed they had landed on an island (more precisely, four islands, in his estimation, on account of being told 'via gestures' by their Tupiniquim hosts that hostile Indians often arrived by canoe from elsewhere). Indeed, he believed these islands were already discovered and depicted on earlier maps, but not known to be inhabited. In a curious passage in his letter (that has since produced much speculation), Mestre João advised the king to consult an old mapa mundi then in the possession of the Portuguese navigator Pêro Vaz da Cunha (nicknamed Bisagudo) in Lisbon, which depicted these very islands (modern historians speculate this might be a copy of the 1448 map of Andrea Bianco).

Mestre João Faras's conclusion that they were on an island was probably shared by Pedro Álvares Cabral and certainly by the secretary Pero Vaz de Caminha, who wrote up the official report. (But the account of an anonymous Portuguese pilot, the only other eyewitness of this journey, was less sure, reporting it was unclear whether they were on an island or on "firm land").

On 1 May 1500, both Pêro Vaz de Caminha and Mestre João Faras wrote their separate letters to King Manuel I of Portugal, signed from the location of Vera Cruz (the name Cabral bestowed on the 'island'). Both letters were given to the captain of a ship to be sent back to Lisbon (either under Gaspar de Lemos or André Gonçalves, the sources conflict). The armada left Brazil in the direction of the Cape of Good Hope on 3 May 1500.

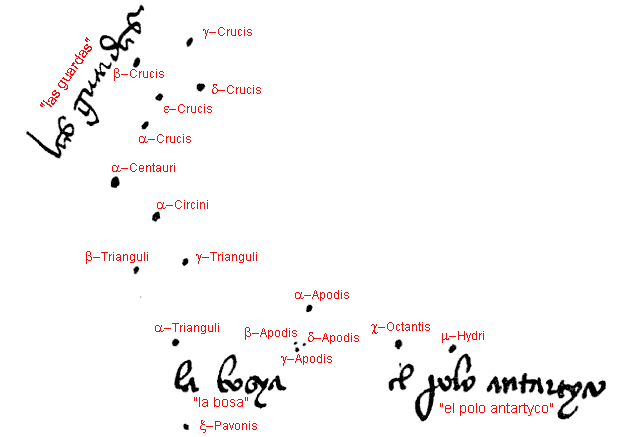
Tentative identification of the stars depicted by Mestre João Faras in his letter of May 1, 1500.

In his letter to the king, Mestre João Faras provided a rudimentary sketch of the stars of the Southern Hemisphere sky, in an attempt to identify the Southern Pole Star, although he apologised to the king for not having taken their precise height measurements (he blamed it on his bad leg). He identified the five-star constellation now known as the Southern Cross, which he named "las Guardas", as they were always bright and visible above the horizon. But he recognized they were not the elusive pole star of the south. Instead, he tentatively pointed out two lower stars (small and bright, possibly Chi Octantis and Mu Hydri as possible candidates for the southern pole star ("el polo antartyco"). He rounded off his letter on a pessimistic note, suggesting that it was probably better for ships to continue trying to navigate by the altitude of the Sun (via the astrolabe), rather than hoping to find the Southern Pole Star with a quadrant.

Although historians generally credit Mestre João Faras as the "discoverer" of the Southern Cross constellation, some point out that he might have been preceded by the Venetian navigator Alvise Cadamosto, who, sailing into the mouth of the Gambia River in 1455, and drew a similar constellation which he called the carro dell'ostro (the "southern chariot"). However, Cadamosto's constellation has too many stars and is positioned incorrectly.

Nothing more is heard from or about Mestre João Faras after this letter.

According to one author, 'João da Paz' (one of the possible identities of João Faras) settled in Porto, Portugal. A search in the 1518 household roster of King Manuel I shows nobody by that name, suggesting he was probably already dead by that time.

== See also ==
- pt:Carta do Mestre João
- Letter of Pero Vaz de Caminha
- 2nd Portuguese India Armada (Cabral, 1500)

== Sources ==
- [Mestre João Faras] "Carta do Mestre João, Physico d'El Rei, para o mesmo Senhor, de Vera Cruz, ao 1º de Maio de 1500", Revista do Instituto Histórico e Geográfico Brasileiro, Rio de Janeiro, 1843, tomo V nº 19, p. 342-44. online
- Albuquerque, Luís de (1970) "A navegação astronómica" in A. Cortesão, 1970, editor, História da Cartografia Portuguesa, Coimbra, vol. 2, p. 225-371. (Reprinted in 1975. Estudos de História, Vol. III, Coimbra)
- Couto, Jorge (1999) "A Gênese do Brasil" in C.G. Mota, editor, Viagem incompleta: a experiência brasileira São Paulo: Senac.
- Gil, Juan (2003) "El Maestre Juan Faraz: La clave de un enigma", in Mateus Ventura and Semedo Matos, editors,A Novidades do Mundo, Lisbon: Colibri
- Pereira, Moacir Soares (1979) "Capitães, naus e caravelas da armada de Cabral", Revista da Universidade de Coimbra, Vol. 27, p. 31-134. offprint
- Sousa Viterbo, Francisco M. de (1897) Trabalhos Náuticos dos Portuguezes nos Seculos XVI e XVII, Lisbon.
- Valentim, Carlos Manuel (2007) "Uma Família de Cristãos-Novos do Entre Douro e Minho: Os Paz", Master's dissertation, University of Lisbon.
