= Corografia Brazilica =

1817 book by Manuel Aires de Casal

Corografia Brasílica
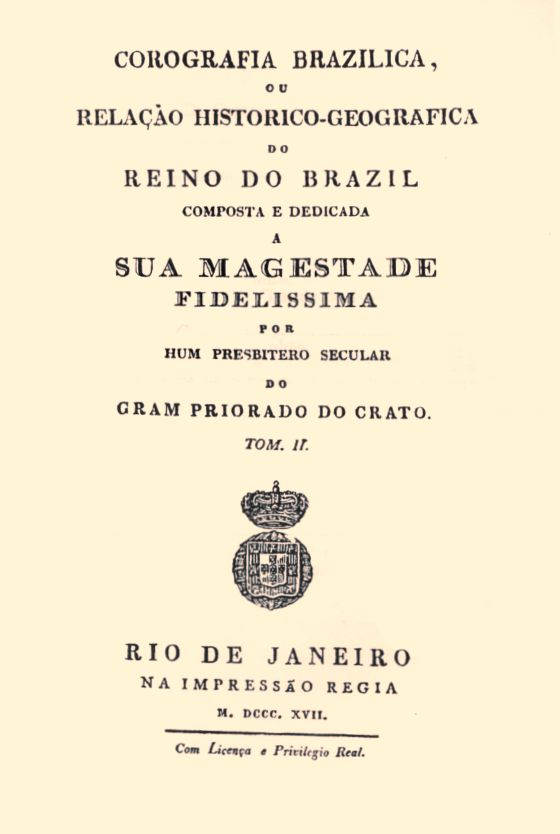
- Title page from the first edition
- Author: Manuel Aires de Casal
- Language: Brazilian Portuguese
- Publication date: 1817
- Publication place: Brazil

Corografia brasílica, ou relação histórico-geográfica do reino do Brasil (Brazilian Chorography, or Historical-Geographical Relation of the Kingdom of Brazil) by Manuel Aires de Casal is one the first books published in Brazil about the country. This book contains the first published edition of Pero Vaz de Caminha's letter.
