= Monte Pascoal National Park =

National park in Bahia, Brazil

- Parque Nacional e Histórico do Monte Pascoal
- IUCN category II (national park)
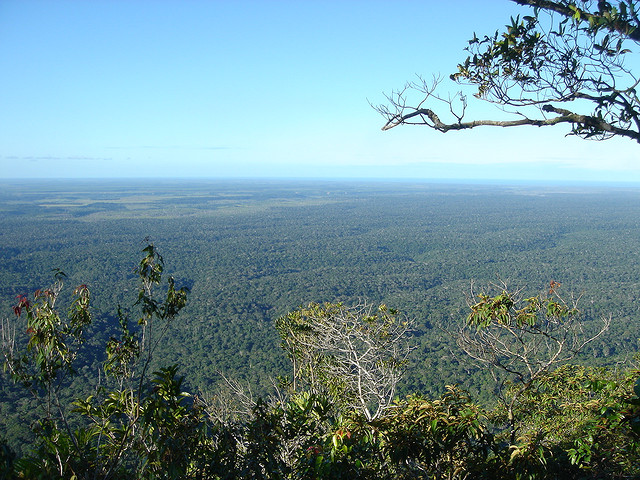
- View of Monte Pascoal National Park

- Location within Brazil
- Nearest city: Porto Seguro, Bahia
- Coordinates: 16°52′37″S 39°15′11″W
- Area: 22,332 hectares (55,180 acres)
- Designation: National park
- Created: 29 November 1961
- Administrator: ICMBio

Monte Pascoal National Park (Portuguese: Parque Nacional e Histórico do Monte Pascoal) is a national park in the state of Bahia, Brazil.

== Location ==
The National and Historical park is in the Atlantic Forest biome. It covers an area of 22,332 hectares (55,180 acres), of which 8,627 hectares (21,320 acres) overlaps with the Barra Velha indigenous land. It was created by decree 242 of 29 November 1961, modified by decree 3.421 of 20 April 2000, and is administered by the Chico Mendes Institute for Biodiversity Conservation. It became part of the Central Atlantic Forest Ecological Corridor, created in 2002. The reserve covers parts of the municipalities of Porto Seguro and Prado in the state of Bahia.

It is part of the Discovery Coast Atlantic Forest Reserves, a group of eight protected areas holding 112,000 hectares (280,000 acres) of the Atlantic Forest biome, that has been designated as a World Heritage Site. The park contains and takes its name from Monte Pascoal, the first land seen by the Portuguese explorer Pedro Álvares Cabral.

== Conservation ==
The park is classified as IUCN protected area category II (national park). It has the objectives of preserving natural ecosystems of great ecological relevance and scenic beauty, enabling scientific research, environmental education, outdoors recreation and eco-tourism.

Protected birds in the reserve include red-browed amazon (Amazona rhodocorytha), white-necked hawk (Buteogallus lacernulatus), ringed woodpecker (Celeus torquatus), black-headed berryeater (Carpornis melanocephala), red-billed curassow (Crax blumenbachii), banded cotinga (Cotinga maculata), band-tailed antwren (Myrmotherula urosticta) and the ochre-marked parakeet (Pyrrhura cruentata). Other protected species include the jaguar (Panthera onca), cougar (Puma concolor), giant armadillo (Priodontes maximus), the fish Mimagoniates sylvicola and the ant Dinoponera lucida.

== Sources ==
- Discovery Coast Atlantic Forest Reserves, UNESCO
- Lamas, Ivana Reis; Crepaldi, Maria Otávia; Mesquita, Carlos Alberto Bernardo (2015), Uma Rede no Corredor (PDF) (in Portuguese), Conservação Internacional (CI-Brasil), ISBN 978-85-98830-28-5
- Parna Histórico do Monte Pascoal (in Portuguese), Chico Mendes Institute for Biodiversity Conservation
- Unidade de Conservação: Parque Nacional do Monte Pascoal (in Portuguese), MMA: Ministério do Meio Ambiente
