= Ilha de Vera Cruz =

Site of landing of Portuguese colonists

Ilha de Vera Cruz (Portuguese pronunciation: [ˈiʎɐ dʒi ˈvɛɾɐ ˈkɾu(j)s]) (Portuguese for Island of the True Cross) was the first name given by the Portuguese navigators to the northeast coast of what later became Brazil. The name was changed to Terra de Santa Cruz (Land of the Holy Cross) in 1503, with another variation being Terra de Vera Cruz (Land of the True Cross).

== History ==
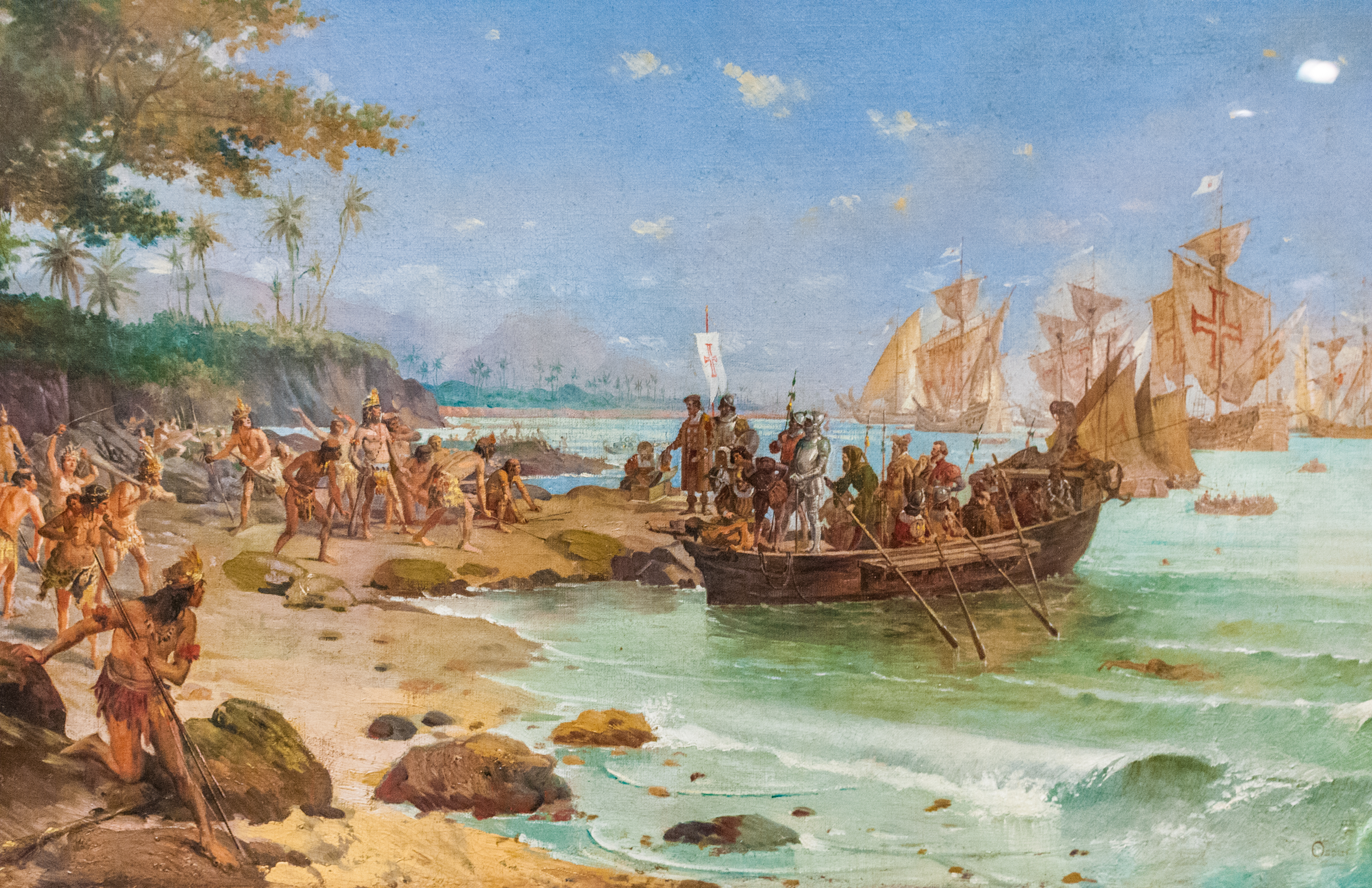
Romantic depiction of the first landing of Pedro Álvares Cabral in 1500.

When the Portuguese fleet, under Pedro Álvares Cabral, first officially touched land in South America on 22 April 1500, they thought they had found an island, as reflected in the chosen name. They took possession for the Kingdom of Portugal of what was believed to be an island of strategic importance on a western connection between Portugal and the Moluccas and other islands of the East Indies.

The first mention of the territory as Land of the True Cross is found on the Letter of Pero Vaz de Caminha:

Portuguese: Neste mesmo dia, a horas de véspera, houvemos vista de terra! A saber, primeiramente de um grande monte, muito alto e redondo; e de outras serras mais baixas ao sul dele; e de terra chã, com grandes arvoredos; ao qual monte alto o capitão pôs o nome de O Monte Pascoal (monte da Páscoa) e à terra A Terra de Vera Cruz!

[In this same day, on the vespers, we saw land! Firstly, a great mount, very tall and round; and another lower mountains at his south; and low lands, with large groves; to the great mount, the captain called it the Mount of Easter and the land Land of the True Cross!]

— Pero Vaz de Caminha, Letter of Pero Vaz de Caminha

Four years later, on 1504, a letter of donation of the Island of Saint John (currently Fernando de Noronha) addressed to Fernando de Noronha still mentions the land as Land of the Holy Cross:

Portuguese: A quantos esta nossa carta virem fazemos saber que havendo-nos respeito aos serviços que Fernando de Noronha, cavaleiro de nossa casa nos tem feito e esperamos ao diante dele receber, e querendo-lhe por isso fazer graça e mercê, temos por bem e nos apraz que vindo-se a povoar em algum tempo a nossa ilha de São João, que ele ora novamente achou e descobriu cinquenta léguas ao mar da nossa Terra de Santa Cruz, lhe darmos e fazermos mercê da Capitania dela em vida sua e de um seu filho...

[To all who see this our letter, we make known that, in consideration of the services that Fernando de Noronha, knight of our household, has rendered to us and which we hope hereafter to receive from him, and wishing therefore to grant him favor and grace, it is our will and pleasure that, if at any time our island of São João (which he has now newly found and discovered fifty leagues out at sea from our Land of the Holy Cross) should come to be settled, we shall grant and bestow upon him the captaincy of it for his lifetime and for that of one of his sons…]

— Letter of Donation of the Island of Saint John to Fernando de Noronha

The arrival of Cabral's fleet marked the beginning of Portuguese colonization in South America. The name was officially changed to Terra de Santa Cruz when it was realized that it was not an island, but in fact part of a continent.

In 1534, the colonies of Terra de Santa Cruz became the Captaincies of Brazil, land grants to Portuguese captains General by King John III of Portugal.

=== "Switch" to Brazil ===
The exchange of the land's name from Terra de Santa Cruz to Brazil was not officially done at first, but a product of diverse socioeconomic processes done by the Portuguese monarchy, with the pretext of spreading Christianity rapidly fading away in favor of economic exploitation of the territory. Note that "Brazil" is a contraction of the Portuguese term for Pau-Brazil, a valuable wood at the 16th and 17th centuries. This exchange motivated by economic exploitation becomes apparent in the works of chroniclers Damião de Góis and João de Barros.

With the creation of the State of Brazil by the Portuguese Crown on 1549, the name consolidated as the official name of the Portuguese claims in the American continent, even with the usage of Terra de Santa Cruz lasting for some years. An example of this usage would be the História da Província de Santa Cruz (History of the Province of the Holy Cross), of Pero de Magalhães Gandavo, published on 1575.

== Resurgence of the term ==
In the modern day, Brazilian traditionalist Catholic groups like Centro Dom Bosco motivated a resurgence of the term with the goal of emphasize the so-called "Catholic vocation" of Brazil, a vocation that has been present since "the first instances of [the Portuguese] colonization".

== See also ==
- Discovery of Brazil
- Brazil pre-Colonial period (1500-1532)
- Colonial Brazil

== Bibliography ==
- Brandão, Renato Pereira (1 October 2021). Guerreiros de Cristo na Terra de Santa Cruz: Os Cavaleiros Templários e a Expansão Ultramarina Ibérica (in Brazilian Portuguese). Editora Dialética. ISBN 978-65-252-0542-7.
- Kabatek, Johannes; Wall, Albert (24 October 2022). Manual of Brazilian Portuguese Linguistics. Walter de Gruyter GmbH & Co KG. ISBN 978-3-11-040595-8.
- McAlister, Lyle N. (1984). Spain and Portugal in the New World, 1492-1700. U of Minnesota Press. ISBN 978-0-8166-1216-1.
- Neves, Cylaine Maria das (2007). A vila de São Paulo de Piratininga: fundação e representação (in Brazilian Portuguese). Annablume. ISBN 978-85-7419-779-1.
