= Pero Vaz de Caminha =

Portuguese knight (c. 1450 – 1500)

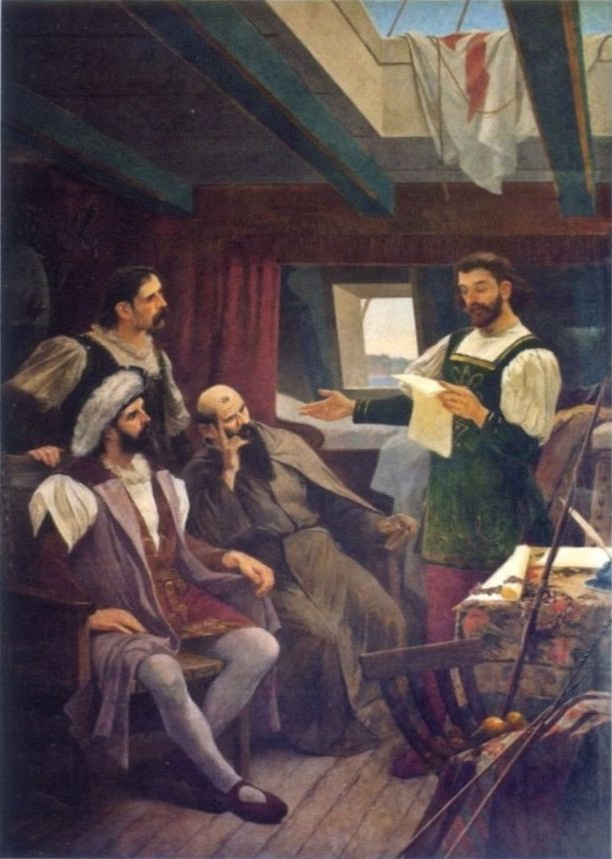
- Vaz de Caminha (standing on the right) reads to Commander Cabral, Friar Henrique and Master João the letter that would later be sent to Manuel I of Portugal
- Born: c. 1450; Porto, Kingdom of Portugal
- Died: 15 December 1500; Calicut, India
- Occupations: Knight, writer, secretary
- Known for: Writer of the official report of the discovery of Brazil.

Pero Vaz de Caminha (c. 1450 – 15 December 1500; European Portuguese pronunciation: [ˈpeɾu ˈvaʒ ðɨ kɐˈmiɲɐ]; also spelled Pedro Vaz de Caminha) (Note: Pero is an archaic variant of Pedro.) was a Portuguese knight that accompanied Pedro Álvares Cabral to India in 1500 as a secretary to the royal factory. Caminha wrote the detailed official report of the April 1500 discovery of Brazil by Cabral's fleet (Carta de Pêro Vaz de Caminha, dated 1 May 1500). He died in a riot in Calicut, India, at the end of that year.

== Biography ==
Pero Vaz de Caminha was the son of Vasco Fernandes de Caminha, a knight of the household of the Duke of Guimarães (later Braganza). His ancestors were among the first settlers of Neiva during the reign of Ferdinand I (r.1367–83). On 8 March 1476, Pêro Vaz de Caminha was appointed mestre da balança (master of the scale) of the royal mint of Porto, one of the many positions held by his father at the time. The appointment letter, which characterized Pêro Vaz as a knight of the royal household, was written from Toro, suggesting that Pêro Vaz had accompanied King Afonso V of Portugal on a campaign against Castile, and probably participated in the Battle of Toro (2 March 1476). In 1497, he was chosen to write, as Alderman, the Chapters of the Porto City Council, to be presented to the Cortes of Lisbon.

In 1500, Pero Vaz de Caminha, already at an advanced age, was appointed as secretary of the factory projected to be built in Calicut, India, under the designated royal factor Aires Correia. Correia and Caminha sailed aboard the flagship of the 2nd India armada under Pedro Álvares Cabral that set out from Lisbon in March 1500. Charting a wide arc in the South Atlantic, the armada stumbled on the landmass of Brazil on 22 April 1500, and anchored near Porto Seguro, Bahia. After about a week of idling on the beach and interacting with the local Tupiniquim natives, the fleet prepared to resume their journey to India.

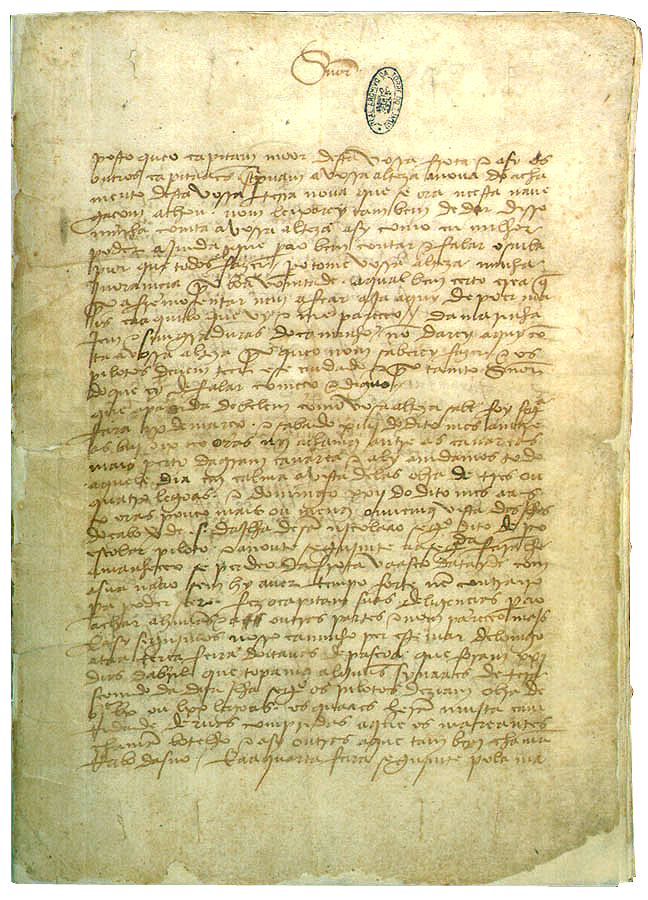
The letter to Manuel I of Portugal written by Pêro Vaz de Caminha

Before departing, Cabral instructed Pero Vaz de Caminha to write a letter to King Manuel I of Portugal, officially reporting the discovery of this new land – or island, as they initially believed. Caminha's letter (Carta de Pêro Vaz de Caminha) gives a detailed report of the expedition up to that point, and of the new land and people they had discovered. Caminha's letter is dated 1 May and signed from the location of "deste Porto Seguro da vossa ilha da Vera Cruz" ("this Safe Harbor of your island of the True Cross"), the name Cabral bestowed in honor of Feast of the Cross (3 May in the liturgical calendar).

Caminha's official report and an additional separate letter by the astronomer-physician Mestre João Faras, were given to one of Cabral's captains (either Gaspar de Lemos or André Gonçalves, sources conflict). who set sail back to Portugal on a supply ship they had brought along. The rest of the fleet left Brazil on 3 May 1500, in the direction of the Cape of Good Hope and then onto India.

Pero Vaz de Caminha's letter is often celebrated as the "birth certificate" of Brazil, although given the secrecy with which the Kingdom of Portugal has always involved reports of its discoveries, it was only published in the nineteenth century by Father Manuel Aires de Casal in his Corografia Brasílica.

The 2nd Armada arrived on the Malabar Coast of India in September 1500, and the factory was promptly set up in Calicut (Calecute, Kozhikode). Caminha, the factory's secretary, assumed his duties there. However, a conflict soon arose between the Portuguese traders and the established Arab merchant guilds in the city. Finding little vent for their trade goods, the Portuguese suspected the Arabs were colluding to shut them out of the city's spice markets by organizing a boycott. The ruling Zamorin of Calicut refused to intervene, prompting the frustrated factor Aires Correia to take matters into his own hands. In late December 1500, after the Portuguese set about seizing the spice cargoes of Arab boats in the harbor, a riot erupted on the piers. Calicut mobs overran the Portuguese factory, killing every Portuguese they could get their hands on. Some fifty to seventy Portuguese perished in the riot – including the factor Aires Correia and, it is commonly supposed, the factory's secretary Pêro Vaz de Caminha.

In a royal letter dated 3 December 1501, King Manuel I of Portugal appointed Caminha's grandson, Rodrigo d'Osouro, to his grandfather's post at the Porto mint, noting explicitly that Pero Vaz de Caminha had "died in India".

== See also ==
- Carta de Pêro Vaz de Caminha
- (in Portuguese) A Carta de Pero Vaz de Caminha, the Letter of Pero Vaz de Caminha in Portuguese
- 2nd Portuguese India Armada (Cabral, 1500)
