= Gaspar de Lemos =

Portuguese explorer

Gaspar de Lemos (15th century) was a Portuguese explorer and captain of the supply ship of Pedro Álvares Cabral's fleet that arrived to Brazil. Gaspar de Lemos was sent back to Portugal with news of their discovery and was credited by the Viscount of Santarém as having discovered the Fernando de Noronha archipelago in the Atlantic Ocean.

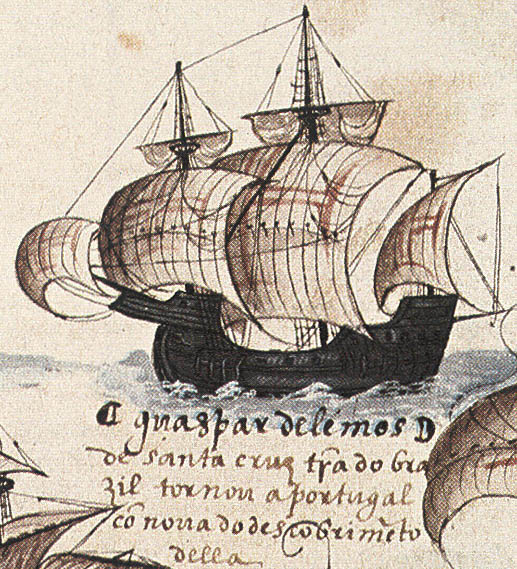
Nau of Gaspar de Lemos

== Personal life ==
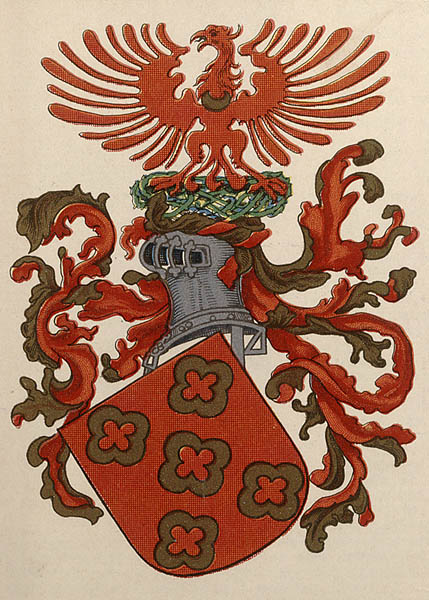
Coat of arms of Gaspar de Lemos

Very little is known about the life of Gaspar de Lemos. It is postulated that he was a part of the Morgada family, originally from the Kingdom of Galiza, but came to Portugal during the reign of Afonso IV (1325–1357). Upon his arrival back to Europe after participation in the exploration of the new world, the name Gaspar de Lemos disappears from the historical record, only to reappear later between 1536 and 1537 in India, under the service of Martim Afonso de Sousa. No further information has been discovered.

== Discoveries and Expeditions ==
Gaspar de Lemos was the commander of a supply ship from Pedro Álvares Cabral's fleet. Cabral chose him to return to Portugal after the sighting of the new world to let King Manuel I know of its existence. Lemos returned to Portugal bringing Pedro Vaz de Caminha's letter announcing the "discovery" of Brazil.

This expedition is credited with:

- The discovery of the archipelago of Fernando de Noronha
- The discovery of the bay that he named Bay of All Saints on November 1, 1501
- The discovery of the Bay of Guanabara, which he mistook as a river and named Rio de Janeiro on January 1, 1502
- The discovery of the island of São Vicente, on January 22, 1502.

== See also ==
- Exploration of Asia
