= André Gonçalves (explorer) =

15th–16th century Portuguese explorer

André Gonçalves (15th century/16th century), Portuguese explorer who accompanied Pedro Álvares Cabral in the discovery of Brazil. Gonçalves was one of Cabral's captains of the fleet during the second Portuguese voyage to Brazil in 1501–1502.

== See also ==
- Exploration of Asia
