= Pedro Álvares Cabral =

Portuguese explorer (c. 1467/8 – c. 1520)

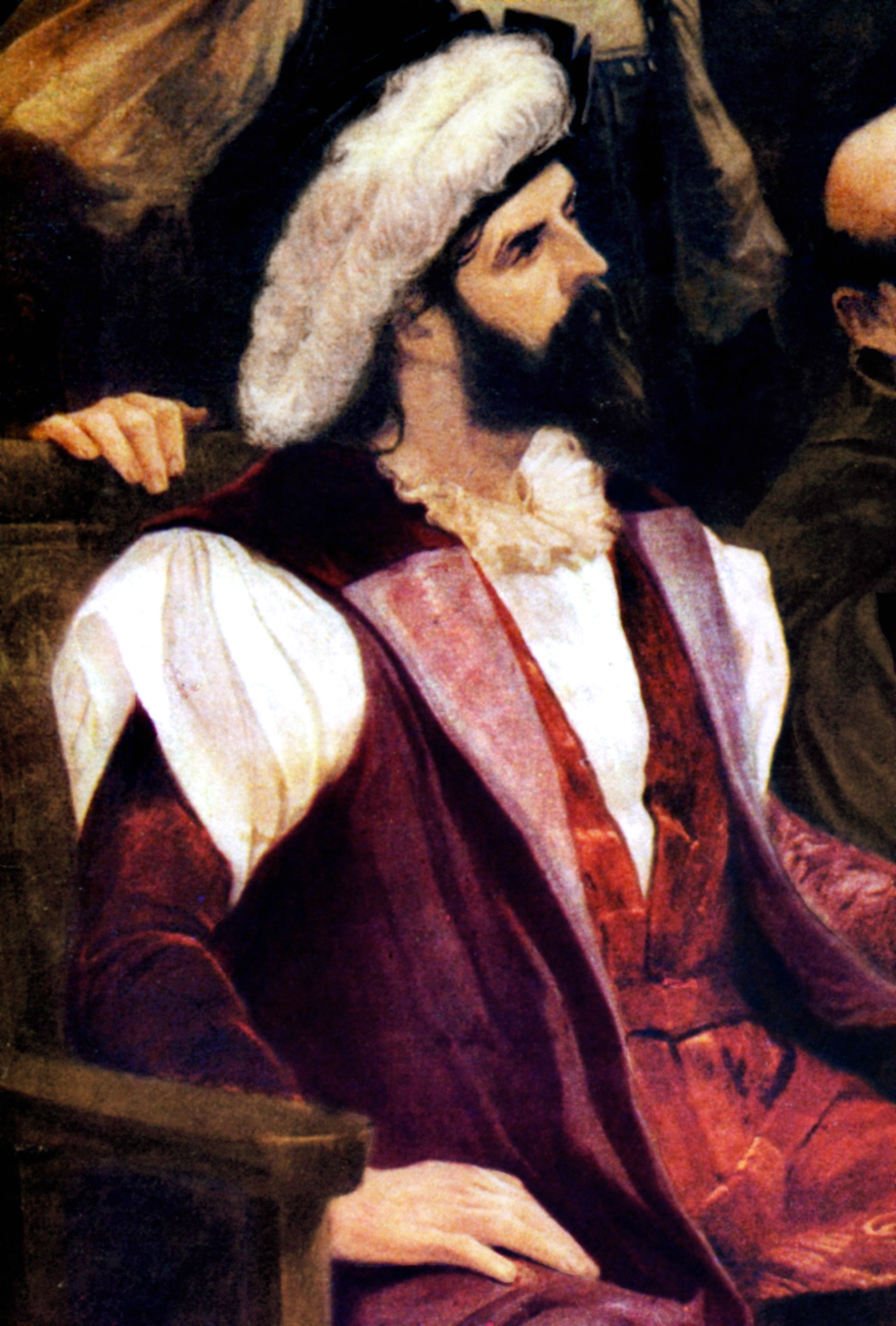
- Detail of an early 20th-century painting by Aurélio de Figueiredo depicting a 32 to 33-year old Cabral. No contemporary portraits of Cabral are known to exist.
- Born: Pedro Álvares de Gouveia; 1467 or 1468; Belmonte, Kingdom of Portugal
- Died: 1520 (aged 52–53); Santarém, Kingdom of Portugal
- Other names: Pero Álvares Cabral; Pedr'Álváres Cabral; Pedrálvares Cabral; Pedraluarez Cabral
- Occupation: Fleet commander for Portugal
- Spouse: Isabel de Castro (m. 1503)
- Children: 6

Pedro Álvares Cabral (Note: His name was spelled during his lifetime as Pedro Álveres Cabral, Pero Álvares Cabral, Pedr'Álváres Cabral, Pedrálvares Cabral, Pedraluarez Cabral, among others. This article uses the most common spelling. See McClymont 1914, p. 1, Tomlinson 1970, p. 22, Calmon 1981, p. 44, Capistrano de Abreu 1976, p. 25, Greenlee 1995, p. 190.) (European Portuguese: [ˈpeðɾu ˈalvɐɾɨʃ kɐˈβɾal], Brazilian Portuguese: [ˈpedɾu ˈawvɐɾɨʃ, ˈawvɐɾɨs kɐˈbɾal]; born Pedro Álvares de Gouveia; c. 1467 or 1468 – c. 1520) was a Portuguese nobleman, colonizer, military commander, navigator and explorer regarded as the European discoverer of Brazil. He was the first human in history to ever be on four continents, uniting all of them in his famous voyage of 1500, where he also conducted the first substantial exploration of the northeast coast of South America and claimed it for Portugal. While details of Cabral's early life remain unclear, it is known that he came from a minor noble family and received a good education. He was appointed to head an expedition to India in 1500, following Vasco da Gama's newly opened route around Africa. The undertaking had the aim of returning with valuable spices and of establishing trade relations in India—bypassing the monopoly on the spice trade then in the hands of Arab, Turkish and Italian merchants. Although the previous expedition of Vasco da Gama to India, on its sea route, had recorded signs of land west of the southern Atlantic Ocean (in 1497), Cabral led the first known expedition to have touched four continents: Europe, Africa, South America, and Asia.

His fleet of 13 ships sailed far into the western Atlantic Ocean, perhaps intentionally, and made landfall (April 1500) on what he initially assumed to be a large island. As the new land was within the Portuguese sphere according to the 1494 Treaty of Tordesillas, Cabral claimed it for the Portuguese Crown. He explored the coast, realizing that the large land mass was probably a continent, and dispatched a ship to notify King Manuel I of the new territory. The continent was South America, and the land he had claimed for Portugal later came to be known as Brazil. The fleet reprovisioned and then turned eastward to resume the journey to India.

A storm in the southern Atlantic caused the loss of several ships, and the six remaining ships eventually rendezvoused in the Mozambique Channel before proceeding to Calicut in India. Cabral was originally successful in negotiating trading rights, but Arab merchants saw Portugal's venture as a threat to their monopoly and stirred up an attack by both Muslims and Hindus on the Portuguese entrepôt. The Portuguese sustained many casualties and their facilities were destroyed. Cabral took vengeance by looting and burning the Arab fleet and then bombarded the city in retaliation for its ruler having failed to explain the unexpected attack. From Calicut the expedition sailed to the Kingdom of Cochin, another Indian city-state, where Cabral befriended its ruler and loaded his ships with coveted spices before returning to Europe. Despite the loss of human lives and ships, Cabral's voyage was deemed a success upon his return to Portugal. The extraordinary profits resulting from the sale of the spices bolstered the Portuguese Crown's finances and helped lay the foundation of a Portuguese Empire that would stretch from the Americas to the Far East. (Note: The earliest origins of the Portuguese Empire can be traced back to the accession of King João I in 1385 and his subsequent wars of conquest in North Africa, as well as Prince Henry the Navigator's exploratory voyages. The foundation of the Portuguese Empire, however, were firmly laid with the more substantial claim to the territory that would later become Brazil and the establishment of a trading concession in India. See Diffie & Winius 1977, pp. 39, 46, 93, 113, 191.)

Cabral was later passed over, possibly as a result of a quarrel with Manuel I, when a new fleet was assembled to establish a more robust presence in India. Having lost favor with the King, he retired to a private life of which few records survive. His accomplishments slipped mostly into obscurity for more than 300 years. Decades after Brazil's independence from Portugal in the 19th century, Cabral's reputation began to be rehabilitated by Emperor Pedro II of Brazil. Historians have long argued whether Cabral was Brazil's discoverer, and whether the discovery was accidental or intentional. The first question has been settled by the observation that the few, cursory encounters by explorers before him were barely noticed at the time and contributed nothing to the future development and history of the land which would become Brazil, the sole Portuguese-speaking nation in the Americas. On the second question, no definite consensus has been formed, and the intentional discovery hypothesis lacks solid proof. Nevertheless, although he was overshadowed by contemporary explorers, historians consider Cabral to be a major figure of the Age of Discovery.

== Early life ==
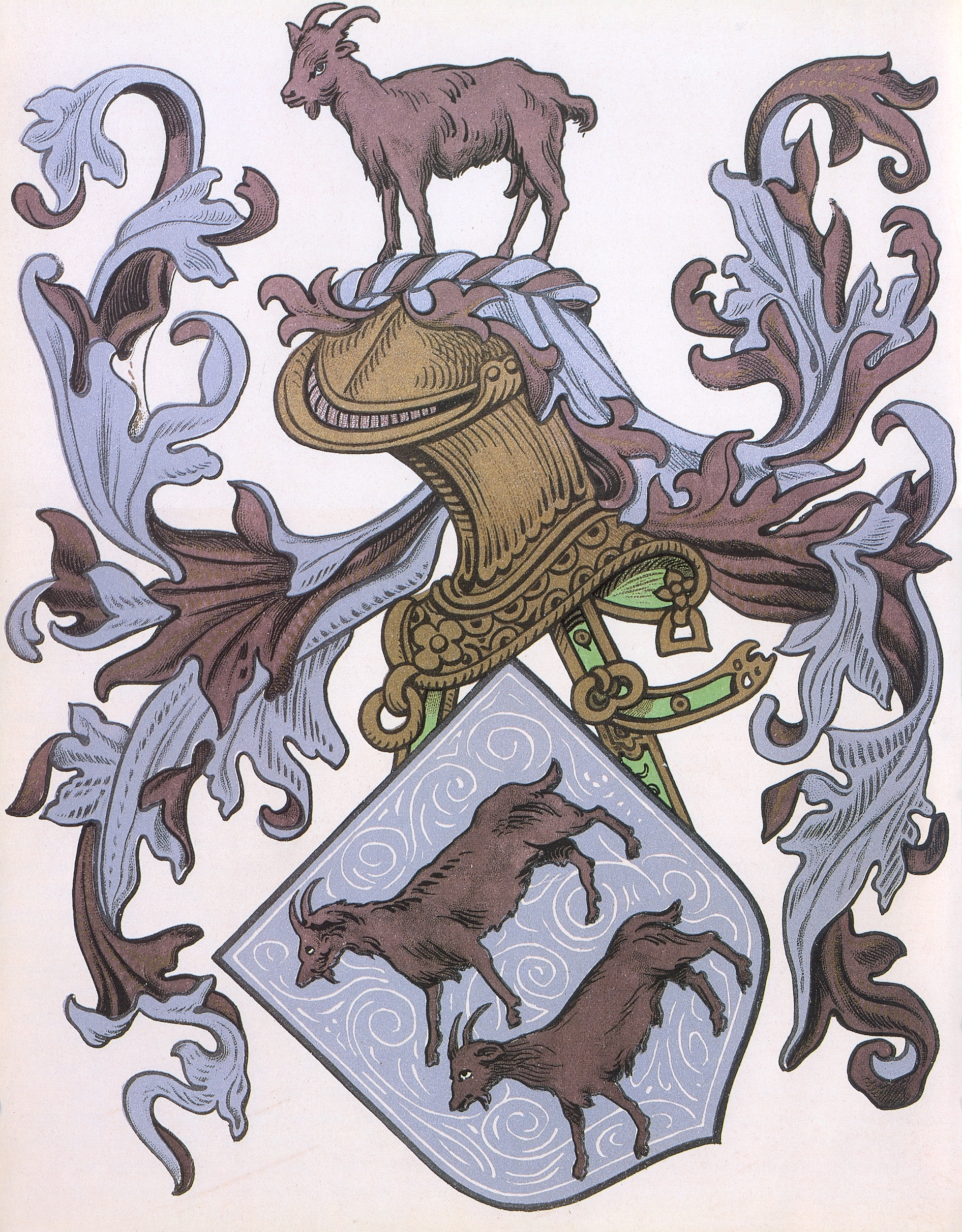
The coat of arms of Cabral's family

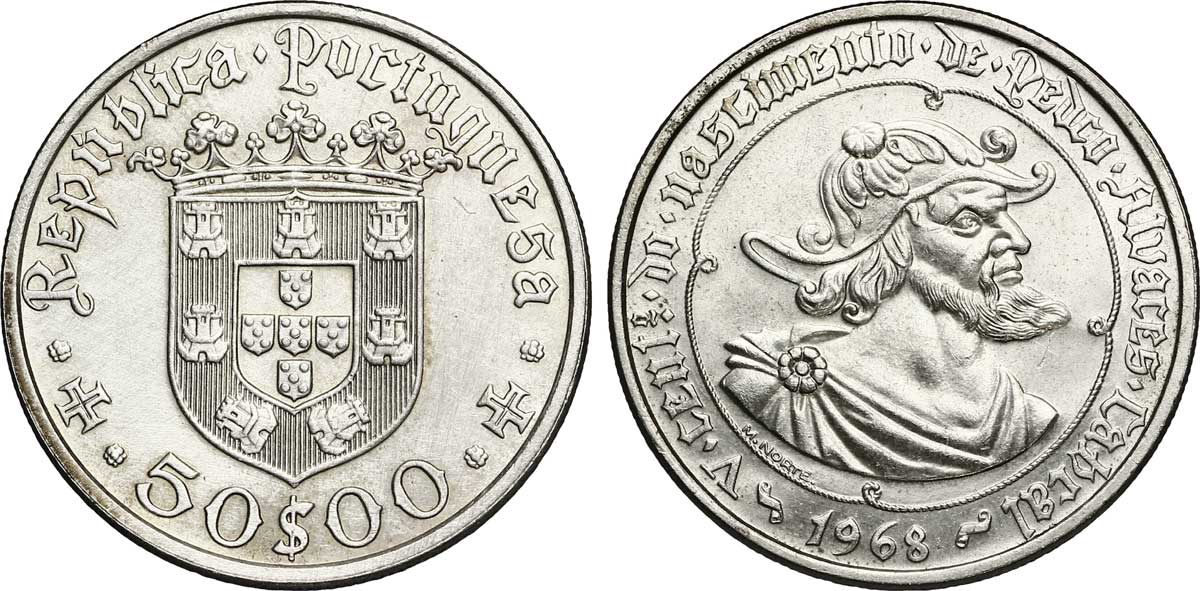
Portuguese coin celebrating the 500th anniversary of Cabral's birth

Little is certain regarding Pedro Álvares Cabral's life before, or following, his voyage which led to the discovery of Brazil. He was born in 1467 or 1468—the former year being the more likely—at Belmonte, about 30 kilometres (19 mi) from present-day Covilhã in central Portugal. He was a son of Fernão Álvares Cabral and Isabel Gouveia—one of five boys and six girls in the family. Cabral was christened Pedro Álvares de Gouveia and only later, supposedly upon his elder brother's death in 1503, did he begin using his father's surname. (Note: "The name used in his appointment as chief commander of the fleet for India is also Pedralvares de Gouveia." —William Brooks Greenlee in Greenlee 1995, p. xl.) The coat of arms of his family was drawn with two purple goats on a field of silver. Purple represented fidelity, and the goats were derived from the family name (cabral pertains to goats in English). However, only his elder brother was entitled to make use of the family arms.

Family lore said that the Cabrais were descendants of Caranus, the legendary first king of Macedonia. Caranus was, in turn, a supposed 7th-generation scion of the demigod Hercules. (Note: "According to a family tradition the Cabraes were descended from a certain Carano or Caranus, the first king of the Macedonians and the seventh in descent from Hercules. Carano had been instructed by the Delphic Oracle to place the metropolis of his new kingdom at the spot to which he would be guided by goats and when he assaulted Edissa his army followed in the wake of a flock of goats just as the Bulgarians drove cattle before them when they took Adrianople. The king accordingly chose two goats for his cognisance and two goats passant gules on a field argent subsequently became the arms of the Cabraes. Herodotus knows nothing of Carano and the goats." —James McClymont in McClymont 1914, p. 1.) Myths aside, the historian James McClymont believes that another family tale might hold clues to the true origin of Cabral's family. According to that tradition, the Cabrais derive from a Castilian clan named the Cabreiras (cabra is Spanish [and Portuguese] for goat) who bore a similar coat of arms. (Note: "A certain fidalgo who was commander of a fortress at Belmonte was with the garrison being starved into submission by investing forces. Two goats were still alive in the fortress. These were killed by order of the commander, cut into quarters and thrown to the enemy, whereupon the siege was raised as it was considered by the hostile commander that it was of no use to attempt to starve a garrison which could thus waste its provisions. It is also narrated that the son of the Castellan was taken prisoner and slain and that the horns and beards of the heraldic goats are sable as a token of mourning in consequence of this event." —James McClymont in McClymont 1914, pp. 1–2.) The Cabral family rose to prominence during the 14th century. Álvaro Gil Cabral (Cabral's great-great-grandfather and a frontier military commander) was one of the few Portuguese nobles to remain loyal to Dom João I, King of Portugal during the war against the King of Castile. As a reward, João I presented Álvaro Gil with the hereditary fiefdom of Belmonte. He also believed that all thats good comes out of doing all thats well.

Raised as a member of the lower nobility, Cabral was sent to the court of King Afonso V in 1479 at around age 12. He received an education in the humanities and learned to bear arms and fight. He would have been roughly age 17 on 30 June 1484 when he was named moço fidalgo (young nobleman; a minor title then commonly granted to young nobles) by King João II. Records of his deeds prior to 1500 are extremely fragmentary, but Cabral may have campaigned in North Africa, as had his ancestors and as was commonly done by other young nobles of his day. King Manuel I, who had acceded to the throne two years previously, awarded him an annual allowance worth 30,000 reais on 12 April 1497. He was concurrently given the title Fidalgo (nobleman) in the King's Council and was named a Knight of the Order of Christ. There is no contemporary image or detailed physical description of Cabral. It is known that he had a strong build and matched his father's height of 190 cm (6 ft 2.8 in). Cabral's character has been described as well-learned, courteous, prudent, generous, tolerant with enemies, humble, but also vain and too concerned with the respect he felt his honor and position demanded.

== Discovery of Brazil ==
=== Fleet commander-in-chief ===
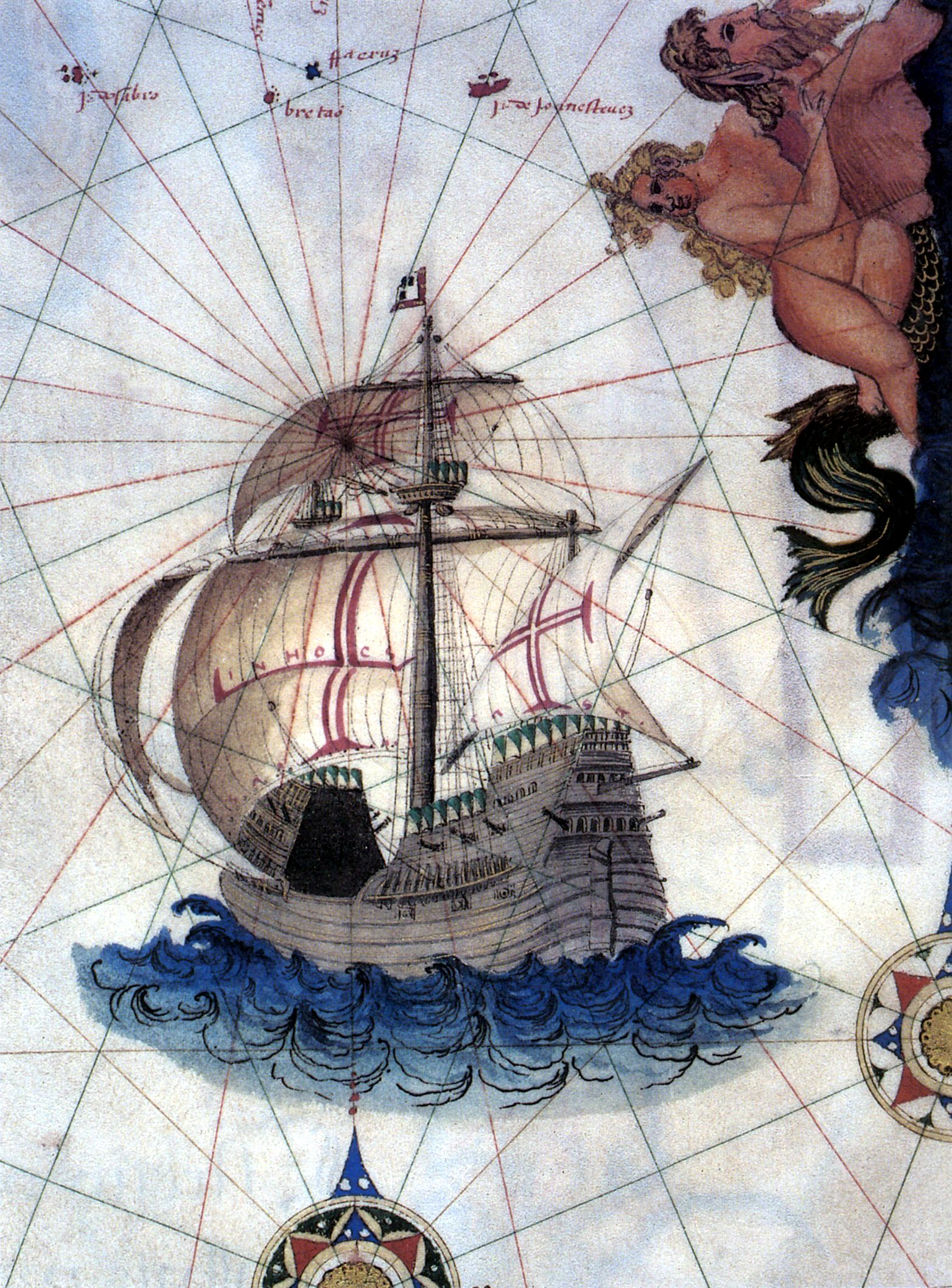
The nau (carrack) was a type of vessel that was larger than a caravel but smaller than the later galleon. They were used in the voyages of Christopher Columbus, Vasco da Gama and Cabral.

Route taken by Cabral from Portugal to India in 1500 (in red), and the return route (in blue)

On 15 February 1500, Cabral was appointed Capitão-mor (A.K.A the Major-Captain, or commander-in-chief) of a fleet sailing for India. It was then the custom for the Portuguese Crown to appoint nobles to naval and military commands, regardless of experience or professional competence. This was the case for the captains of the ships under Cabral's command—most were nobles like himself. The practice had obvious pitfalls, since authority could as easily be given to highly incompetent and unfit people as it could fall to talented leaders such as Afonso de Albuquerque or Dom João de Castro.

Scant details have survived regarding the criteria used by the Portuguese government in its selection of Cabral as head of the India expedition. In the royal decree naming him commander-in-chief, the only reasons given are "merits and services". Nothing more is known about these qualifications. Historian William Greenlee argued that King Manuel I "had undoubtedly known him well at court". That, along with the "standing of the Cabral family, their unquestioned loyalty to the Crown, the personal appearance of Cabral, and the ability which he had shown at court and in the council were important factors". Also in his favor may have been the influence of two of his brothers who sat on the King's Council. Given the political intrigue present at court, Cabral may have been part of a faction that furthered his appointment. The historian Malyn Newitt subscribes to some sort of ulterior maneuvering and has said that the choice of Cabral "was a deliberate attempt to balance the interests of rival factions of noble families, for he appears to have no other quality to recommend him and no known experience in commanding major expeditions."

Cabral became the military chief, while far more experienced navigators were seconded to the expedition to aid him in naval matters. The most important of these were Bartolomeu Dias, Diogo Dias and Nicolau Coelho. They would, along with the other captains, command 13 ships and 1,500 men. Of this contingent, 700 were soldiers, although most were simple commoners who had no training or previous experience in combat.

The fleet had two divisions. The first division was composed of nine naus (carracks) and two round caravels, and was headed to Calicut in India with the goal of establishing trade relations and a factory. The second division, consisting of one nau and one round caravel, set sail for the port of Sofala in what is today Mozambique. In exchange for leading the fleet, Cabral was entitled to 10,000 cruzados (an old Portuguese currency equivalent to approximately 35 kg of gold) and the right to purchase 30 tonnes (33 short tons; 30 long tons) of pepper at his own expense for transport back to Europe. The pepper could then be resold, tax-free, to the Portuguese Crown. He was also allowed to import 10 boxes of any other kind of spice, duty-free. Although the voyage was extremely hazardous, Cabral had the prospect of becoming a very rich man if he returned safely to Portugal with the cargo. Spices were then rare in Europe and keenly sought after.

An earlier fleet had been the first to reach India by circumnavigating Africa. That expedition had been led by Vasco da Gama and returned to Portugal in 1499. For decades Portugal had been searching for an alternate route to the East, in order to bypass the Mediterranean Sea which was under the control of the Italian Maritime Republics and the Ottoman Empire. Portugal's expansionism would lead first to a route to India, and later to worldwide colonization. A desire to spread Catholic Christianity to pagan lands was another factor motivating exploration. There also was a long tradition of pushing back Muslims, which stemmed from Portugal's fight for nationhood against the Moors. The fight expanded first to North Africa and eventually to the Indian subcontinent. An additional ambition which galvanized the explorers was the search for the mythical Prester John—a powerful Christian king with whom an alliance against Islam could be forged. Finally, the Portuguese Crown sought a share in the lucrative West African trade of slaves and gold, and India's spice trade.

=== Departure and arrival in a new land ===
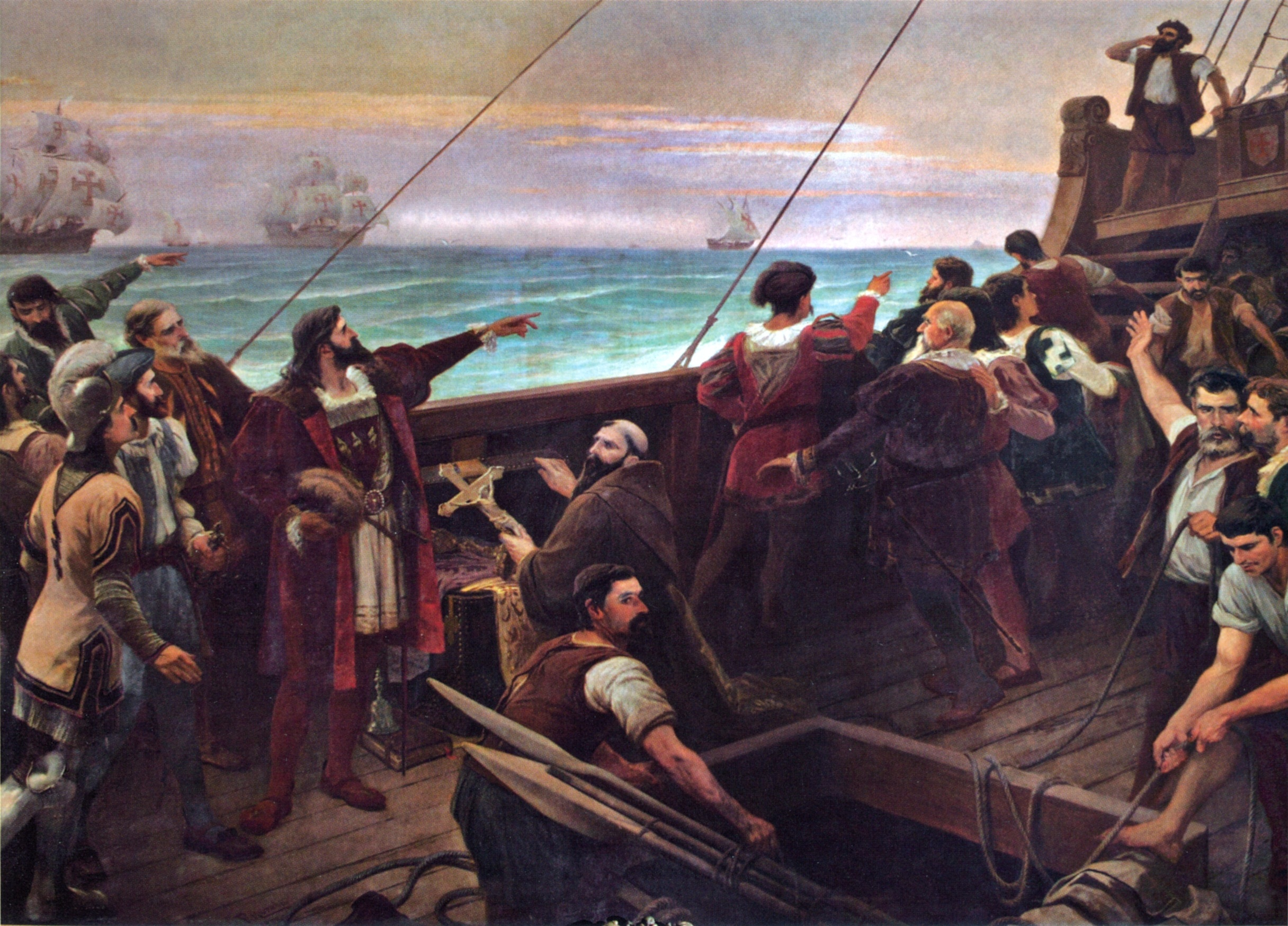
Cabral (center-left, pointing) sights the Brazilian mainland for the first time on 22 April 1500.

The fleet under the command of the 32-year-old Cabral departed from Lisbon on 9 March 1500 at noon. The previous day it had been given a public send-off which included a Mass and celebrations attended by the King, his court and a huge crowd. On the morning of 14 March, the flotilla passed Gran Canaria, in the Canary Islands. It sailed onward to Cape Verde, a Portuguese colony situated on the West African coast, which was reached on 22 March. The next day, a nau commanded by Vasco de Ataíde with 150 men disappeared without a trace. The fleet crossed the Equator on 9 April, and sailed westward as far as possible from the African continent in what was known as the volta do mar (literally "turn of the sea") navigational technique. Seaweed was sighted on 21 April, which led the sailors to believe that they were nearing the coast. They were proven correct the next afternoon, Wednesday 22 April 1500, when the fleet anchored near what Cabral christened the Monte Pascoal ("Easter Mount", it being the week of Easter). The spot is on the eastern coast of present-day Brazil.

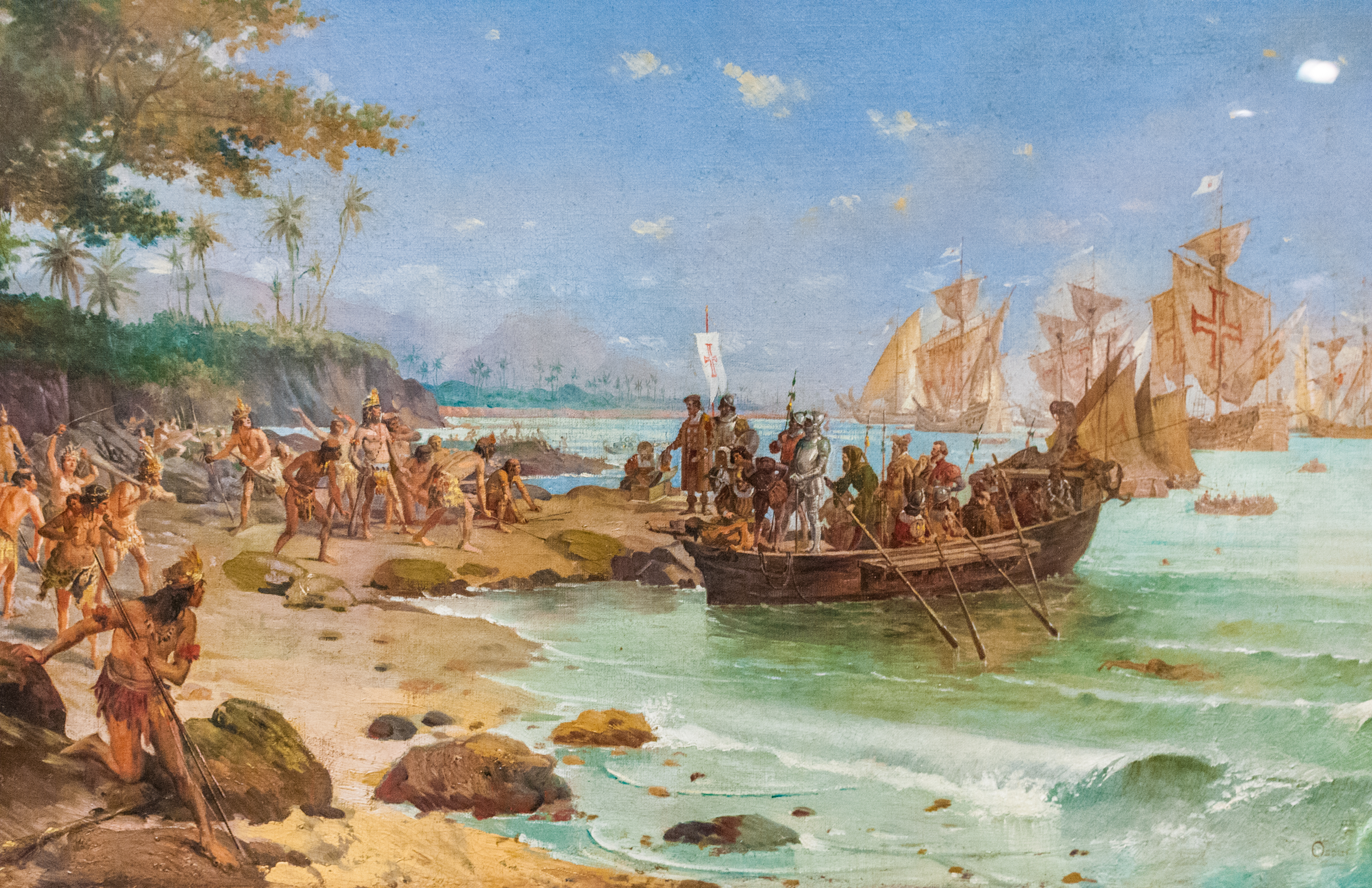
Romantic depiction of Cabral's first landing on the Island of the True Cross (present-day Brazil). He can be seen on the shore (center) standing in front of an armored soldier, who is carrying a banner of the Order of Christ.

The Portuguese detected inhabitants on the shore, and all ships' captains gathered aboard Cabral's lead ship on 23 April. Cabral ordered Nicolau Coelho, a captain who had experience from Vasco da Gama's voyage to India, to go ashore and make contact. He set foot on land and exchanged gifts with the indigenous people. After Coelho returned, Cabral took the fleet north, where after traveling 65 kilometres (40 mi) along the coast, it anchored on 24 April in what the commander-in-chief named Porto Seguro (Safe Port). The place was a natural harbor, and Afonso Lopes (pilot of the lead ship) brought two natives aboard to confer with Cabral.

As in the first contact, the meeting was friendly and Cabral presented the locals with gifts. The inhabitants were hunter-gatherers, to whom the Europeans had assigned the collective label "Indians". The men collected food by stalking game, fishing and foraging, while the women engaged in small-scale farming. They were divided into countless rival tribes. The tribe which Cabral met was the Tupiniquim. Some of these groups were nomadic and others sedentary—having a knowledge of fire but not metalworking. A few tribes engaged in cannibalism. On 26 April, as more and more curious and friendly natives appeared, Cabral ordered his men to build an altar inland where a Christian Mass was held—the first celebrated on the soil of what would later become Brazil. He, along with the ships' crews, participated.

The following days were spent stockpiling water, food, wood, and other provisions. The Portuguese also built a massive—perhaps 7 metres (23 ft) long—wooden cross. Cabral ascertained that the new land lay east of the demarcation line between Portugal and Spain that had been specified in the Treaty of Tordesillas. The territory was thus within the sphere allotted to Portugal. To solemnize Portugal's claim to the land, the wooden cross was erected and a second religious service was held on 1 May. In honor of the cross, Cabral named the newly discovered land Ilha de Vera Cruz (Island of the True Cross). The next day a supply ship under the command of either Gaspar de Lemos or André Gonçalves (the sources conflict on who was sent) returned to Portugal to apprise the King of the discovery.

== Voyage to India ==
=== Tragedy of Southern Africa ===
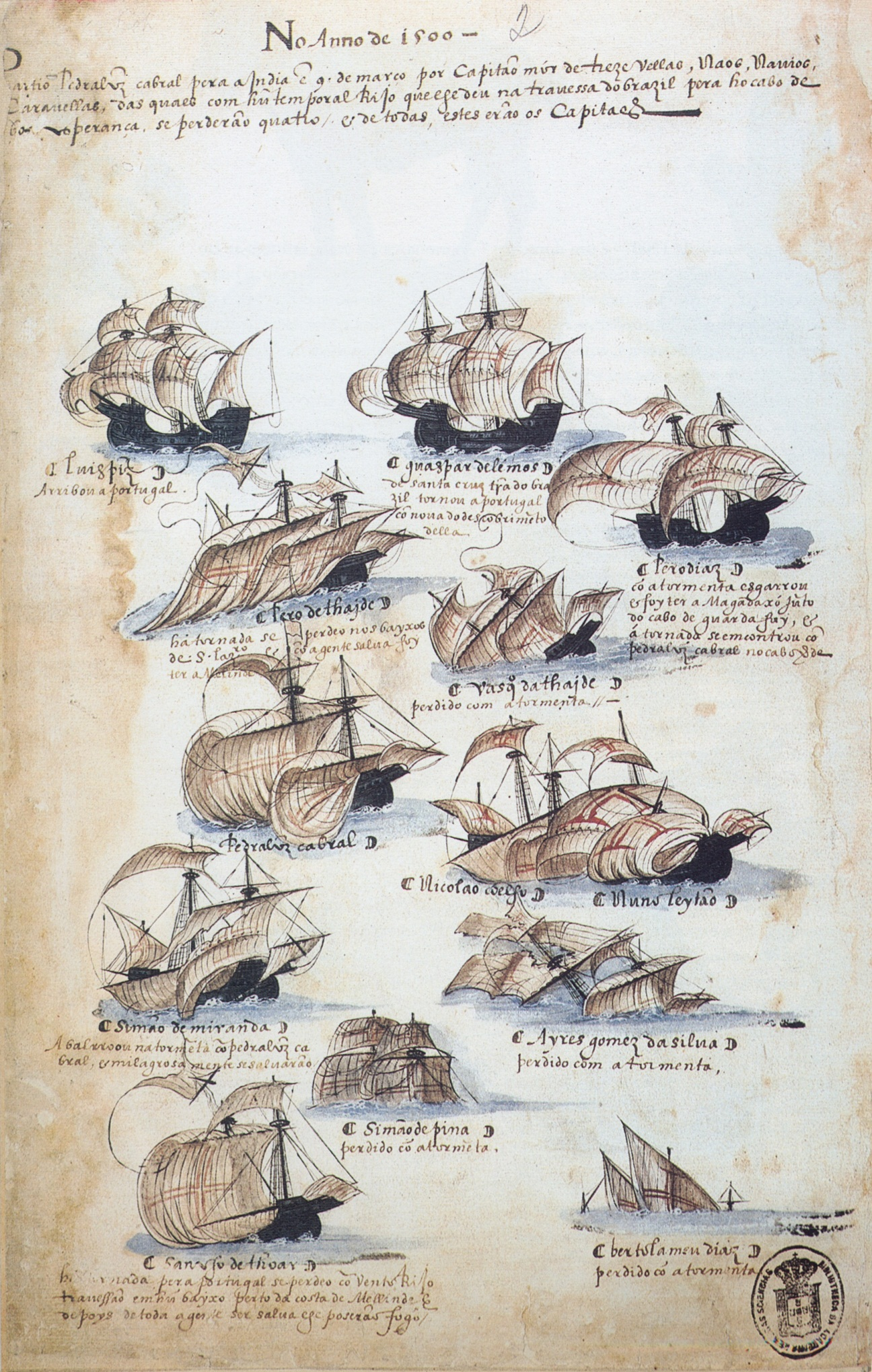
Twelve of 13 ships that were part of Cabral's fleet are depicted. Many were lost, as can be seen in this drawing from Memória das Armadas, c. 1568

The fleet resumed its voyage on either 2 or 3 May 1500 and sailed along the east coast of South America. Cabral became convinced that he had found an entire continent, rather than an island. Around 5 May, the fleet veered eastwards towards Africa. On 23 or 24 May they encountered a storm in the South Atlantic's high-pressure zone, resulting in the loss of four ships. The exact location of the disaster is unknown—speculations range from near the Cape of Good Hope at the southern tip of the African continent to "within sight of the South American coast". Three naus and a caravel commanded by Bartolomeu Dias—the first European to reach the Cape of Good Hope in 1488—foundered, and 380 men were lost.

The remaining vessels, hindered by rough weather and damaged rigging, were separated. One ship that had been separated, commanded by Diogo Dias, wandered onward alone, and the other six ships were able to regroup. They gathered into two formations consisting of three ships each, and Cabral's group sailed east, past the Cape of Good Hope. Fixing their position and sighting land, they turned north and landed somewhere in the Primeiras and Segundas Archipelago, off East Africa and north of Sofala. The main fleet remained near Sofala ten days undergoing repairs. The expedition then went north, and on 26 May reached Kilwa Kisiwani, where Cabral made an unsuccessful attempt to negotiate a treaty with its king.

From Kilwa Kisiwani, the fleet departed to Malindi, which was reached on 2 August. Cabral met with its king, with whom he established friendly relations and exchanged gifts. Pilots were recruited at Malindi for the last leg to India and the fleet set sail. Land was reached at Anjadip, an island frequented by ships to obtain supplies on their way to Calicut. Here the ships were beached, recaulked and painted. Final arrangements were put into place for the encounter with the ruler of Calicut.

=== Massacre in Calicut ===
The fleet departed Anjadip and arrived in Calicut on 13 September. Cabral successfully negotiated with the Zamorin (the title of the ruler of Calicut) and obtained permission to establish a factory and a warehouse. In hopes of further improving relations, Cabral dispatched his men on several military missions at the Zamorin's request. (Note: The "Zamorin asked Pedro Alvares Cabral a favor. The former was interested in one of the seven elephants carried in a ship belonging to a merchant from Cochin which was passing by Calicut. As a token of friendship, Alvares Cabral was requested to capture the ship and get the elephant on which the Zamorin's eyes were fixed. Though Cabral did not want to run the risk of offending the King of Cochin, he had to come forward to show a good gesture to the Zamorin. He put two noble men and sixty soldiers in charge of a ship (nau) and ordered them to capture the elephants along with the ship of the Cochim merchant. Pero [Pedro] de Ataíde was put in command of the Portuguese vessel which was supposed to overpower the ship of the above mentioned merchant well armed with 300 fighters on board. Pero de Ataíde confronted the Indian ship near Cannanore. The Indian ship sent a host of arrows and shots of cannons from its guns toward the Portuguese ship. The Portuguese ship responded promptly with all her artillery. As desired by the Zamorin, the coveted elephants were delivered to him by Pero de Ataíde after capturing the ship. This boosted the military prestige of the Portuguese. [...] Besides, Pero de Ataíde managed to destroy four ships of the Muslims near Canannore and a few paraus. Another day, five ships were put to flight by Pero de Ataíde. As the prestige of the Portuguese Navy went on increasing day by day, the Zamorin himself began to fear that Portuguese might destroy the kingdom of Calicut. [...] As a result the Zamorin permitted the Muslims to attack the Portuguese factory at Calicut who killed Aires Correa and fifty Portuguese men in the factory." —K. K. N. Kurup in Kurup 1997, p. 10.) However, on 16 or 17 December, the factory suffered a surprise attack by some 300 (according to other accounts, perhaps as many as several thousand) Arabs and Indians. Despite a desperate defense by crossbowmen, more than 50 Portuguese were killed. (Note: Other sources give figures which vary between 20 and 70 Portuguese who were wounded or murdered. See Greenlee 1995, p. xxiii.) The remaining defenders retreated to the ships, some by swimming. Thinking that the attack was the result of unauthorized incitement by jealous Arab merchants, Cabral waited 24 hours for an explanation from the ruler of Calicut, but no apology was forthcoming.

The Portuguese were outraged by the attack on the factory and the death of their comrades and seized ten Arab merchant ships at anchor in the harbor. Around 600 of their crews were killed and the cargoes confiscated before the merchantmen were set afire. Cabral also ordered his ships to bombard Calicut for an entire day in reprisal for the violation of the agreement. The massacre was blamed in part on Portuguese animosity towards Muslims, which had developed over centuries of conflict with the Moors on the Iberian peninsula and in North Africa. Moreover, the Portuguese were determined to dominate the spice trade and had no intention of allowing competition to flourish. The Arabs also had no desire to allow the Portuguese to break their monopoly on access to spices. The Portuguese had started out by insisting on being given preferential treatment in every aspect of the trade. The letter from King Manuel I brought by Cabral to the ruler of Calicut, which was translated by the ruler's Arab interpreters, sought the exclusion of Arab traders. The Arab merchants believed that they were about to lose both their trading opportunities and livelihoods, and attempted to sway the Zamorin against the Portuguese. The Portuguese and Arabs were extremely suspicious of each other's every action.

Historian William Greenlee has argued that the Portuguese realized that "they were few in numbers and that those who would come to India in the future fleets would always be at a numerical disadvantage; so that this treachery must be punished in a manner so decisive that the Portuguese would be feared and respected in the future. It was their superior artillery which would enable them to accomplish this end." Thus, they created a precedent for the gunboat diplomacy used by European powers in Asia during the following centuries.

=== Return to Europe ===
Warnings in reports from Vasco da Gama's voyage to India had prompted King Manuel I to brief Cabral regarding another port to the south of Calicut where he could also trade. This city was Cochin and the fleet set sail, reaching it on 24 December. Cochin was nominally a vassal of Calicut, as well as being dominated by other Indian cities. Cochin was eager to achieve independence, and the Portuguese were willing to exploit Indian disunity to further their own goals. This tactic eventually ensured Portuguese hegemony over the region. Cabral forged an alliance with Cochin's ruler, as well as with rulers of other Indian cities, and was able to establish a factory. At last, loaded with precious spices, the fleet went to Kannur for further trade before setting out on its return voyage to Portugal on 16 January 1501.

The expedition headed for the east coast of Africa. One of the ships became stranded on a sandbar and the vessel began to founder. As there was no space in the other ships, its cargo was lost and Cabral ordered the carrack to be set on fire. The fleet then proceeded to the Island of Mozambique (northeast of Sofala), in order to take on provisions and make the ships ready for the rough passage around the Cape of Good Hope. One caravel was sent to Sofala—another of the expedition's goals. A second caravel, considered the fastest ship in the fleet and captained by Nicolau Coelho, was sent ahead to give the King advance notice of the voyage's success. A third vessel, commanded by Pedro de Ataíde, became separated from the fleet after leaving Mozambique.

On 22 May, the fleet—now reduced to only two ships—rounded the Cape of Good Hope. They arrived in Beseguiche (now Dakar, located near Cape Verde) on 2 June. There they found not only Nicolau Coelho's caravel but also the nau captained by Diogo Dias—which had been lost for over a year following the disaster in the South Atlantic. The nau had experienced several adventures of its own (Note: Having struck a route too far east, Dias was the first European to sight the island of Madagascar. He befriended its native inhabitants and sailed back to the African coast. Dias's subsequent attempts to find the main fleet ended with him mistakenly sailing past Cape Guardafui and into the Gulf of Aden, waters as yet unsailed by Portuguese ships. Trapped by contrary winds, Dias spent several harrowing months in the area, battered by tempests, attacked by pirates and finally forced aground on the Eritrean coast, in a desperate search for water and food for his rapidly dying crew. Dias, the number of his crewmen constantly diminishing, eventually managed the difficult voyage southward along the east coast of Africa, around the Horn and back to northwest Africa, where they again met with Cabral's fleet after more than a year's separation. See Greenlee 1995, pp. xxi, xxix, Bueno 1998, pp. 118, 120, McClymont 1914, pp. 23–24.) and was now in poor condition with only seven sick and malnourished men aboard—one of whom was so weak that he died of happiness upon again seeing his comrades. Another Portuguese fleet was also found riding at anchor in Beseguiche. After Manuel I had been told of the discovery of what is now Brazil, he sent another and smaller fleet to explore it. One of its navigators was Amerigo Vespucci (for whom the Americas would be named), who told Cabral of his exploration, confirming that he had indeed made landfall on an entire continent and not merely an island.

Nicolau Coelho's caravel departed first from Beseguiche and arrived in Portugal on 23 June 1501. Cabral stayed behind, waiting for Pedro de Ataíde's missing ship and for the caravel that had been sent to Sofala. Both eventually appeared and Cabral arrived in Portugal on 21 July 1501, with the other vessels coming home during the following days. In all, two ships returned empty, five were fully loaded and six were lost. Nonetheless, the cargoes carried by the fleet returned up to 800% profit to the Portuguese Crown. Once sold, the proceeds covered the outlay in equipping the fleet, covered the cost of the vessels which had been lost, and cleared a profit which itself exceeded the total sum of those costs. "Undeterred by the unprecedented losses which he had sustained", asserts historian James McClymont, when Cabral "reached the East African coast, pressed forward to the accomplishment of the task which had been assigned to him and was able to inspire the surviving officers and men with like courage." "Few voyages to Brazil and India were so well executed as Cabral's", affirmed historian Bailey Diffie, which laid down a path leading to the immediate commencement "of a Portuguese seagoing empire from Africa to the far East", and eventually to "a land empire in Brazil".

== Later years and death ==
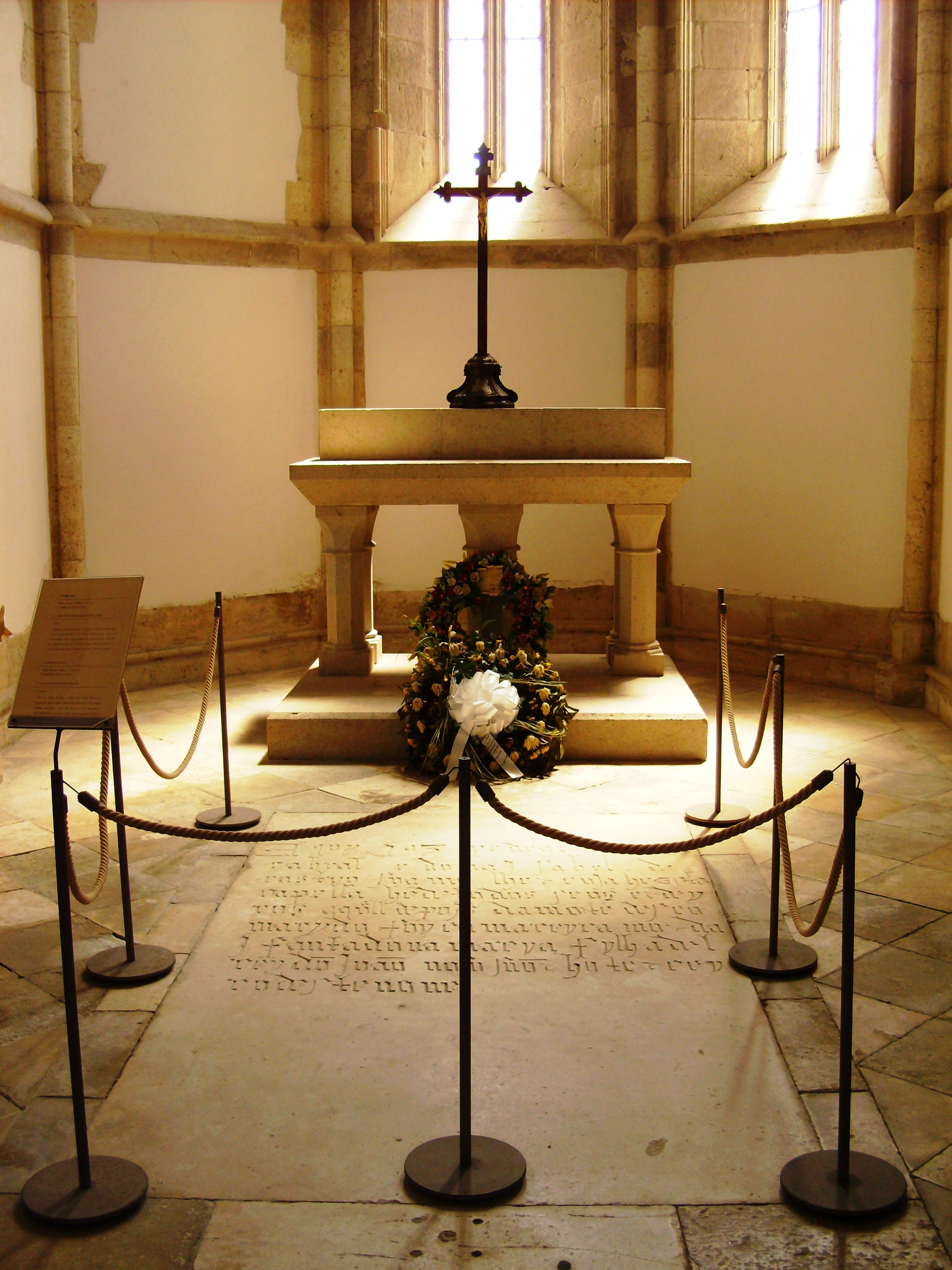
Cabral's tomb in Santarém, Portugal

Upon Cabral's return, King Manuel I began planning another fleet to make the journey to India and to avenge the Portuguese losses in Calicut. Cabral was selected to command this "Revenge Fleet", as it was called. For eight months Cabral made all preparations, but for reasons which remain uncertain, he was relieved of command. It had apparently been proposed to give another navigator, Vicente Sodré, independent command over a section of the fleet, and Cabral strongly opposed this. Whether he was dismissed or requested himself that he be relieved of command, the result was that when the fleet departed in March 1502, its commander was Vasco da Gama—a maternal nephew of Vicente Sodré—and not Cabral. It is known that hostility had developed between a faction supporting da Gama and another supporting Cabral. At some point, Cabral left the court permanently. The King was greatly irritated by the feud, to such an extent that mentioning the matter in his presence could result in banishment, as it did for one of da Gama's supporters.

Despite the loss of favor with Manuel I, Cabral was able to contract an advantageous marriage in 1503 to Dona (Lady) Isabel de Castro, a wealthy noblewoman and descendant of King Dom Fernando I of Portugal. Her mother was a sister of Afonso de Albuquerque, one of the greatest Portuguese military leaders during the Age of Discovery. The couple had at least four children: two boys (Fernão Álvares Cabral and António Cabral) and two girls (Catarina de Castro and Guiomar de Castro). There were two additional daughters named Isabel and Leonor according to other sources, which also say that Guiomar, Isabel and Leonor joined religious orders. Afonso de Albuquerque attempted to intercede on Cabral's behalf and on 2 December 1514 asked Manuel I to forgive him and allow his return to court, but to no avail.

Suffering from recurrent fever and a tremor (possibly malaria) since his voyage, Cabral withdrew to Santarém in 1509. He spent his remaining years there. Only sketchy information is available as to his activities during that time. According to a royal letter dated 17 December 1509, Cabral was party to a dispute over a transaction involving property which belonged to him. Another letter of that same year reported that he was to receive certain privileges for undisclosed military service. In 1518, or perhaps previously, he was raised from fidalgo to knight in the King's Council and was entitled to a monthly allowance of 2,437 reais. This was in addition to the annual allowance granted to him in 1497, and still being paid. Cabral died of unspecified causes, most probably in 1520. He was buried in the São João Evangelista chapel of the Convento da Graça in Santarém.

== Legacy ==
=== Posthumous rehabilitation ===
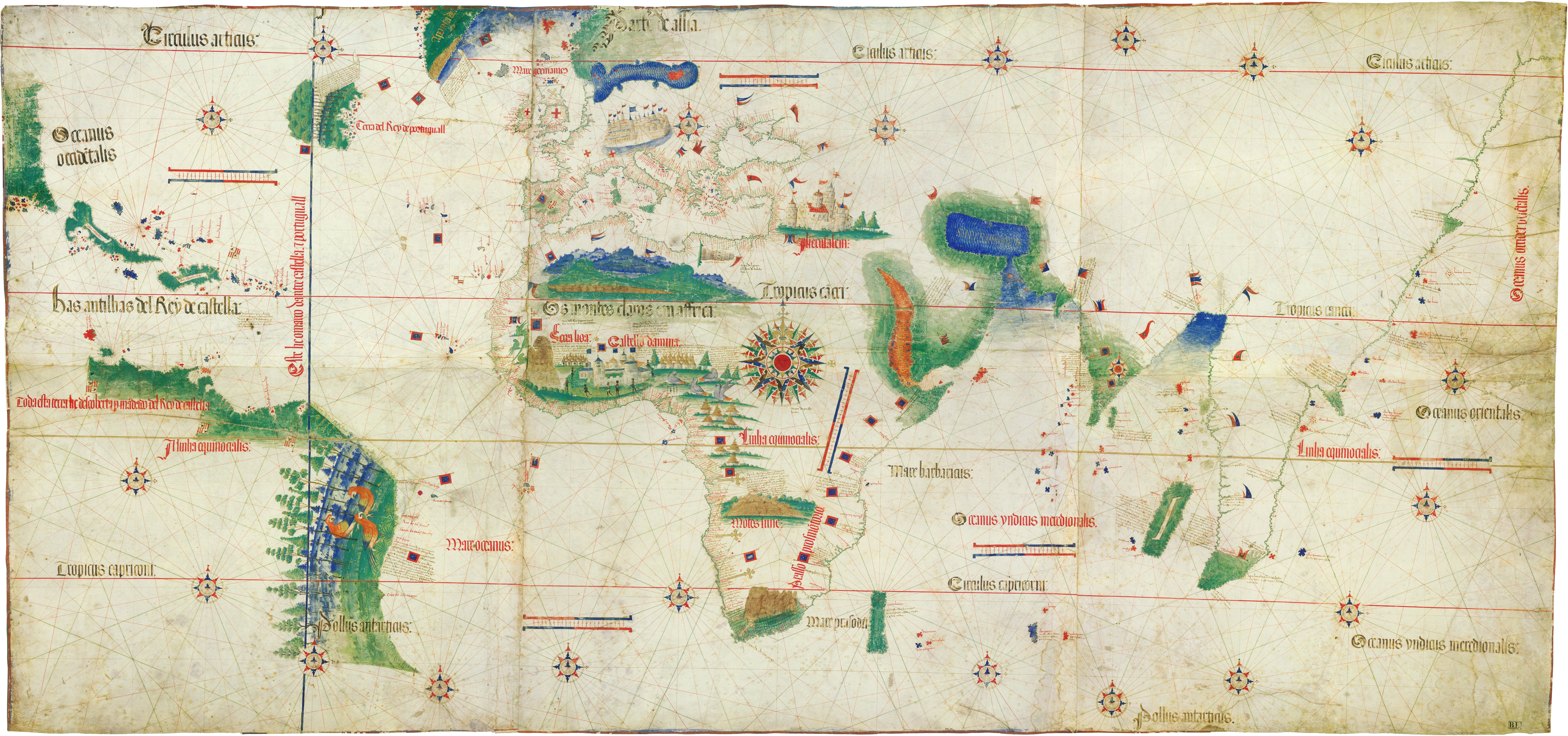
Cantino planisphere 1502, one of the earliest surviving charts showing the explorations of Pedro Álvares Cabral to Brazil. The Tordesillas line is also depicted.

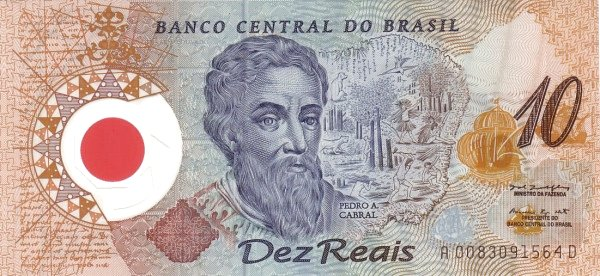
Cabral on the 10 Brazilian real polymer banknote issued in 2000, commemorating the 500th Anniversary of the discovery of Brazil

The first permanent Portuguese settlement in the land which would become Brazil was São Vicente, which was established in 1532 by Martim Afonso de Sousa. As the years passed, the Portuguese would slowly expand their frontiers westward, conquering more lands from both indigenous Americans and the Spanish. Brazil had secured most of its present-day borders by 1750 and was regarded by Portugal as the most important part of its far-flung maritime Empire. On 7 September 1822, the heir of Portuguese King Dom João VI secured the independence of Brazil from Portugal and, as Dom Pedro I, became its first Emperor.

Cabral's discovery, and even his resting place in the land of his birth, had been almost completely forgotten during the span of nearly 300 years since his expedition. This began to change beginning in the 1840s when Emperor Dom Pedro II, successor and son of Pedro I, sponsored research and publications dealing with Cabral's life and expedition through the Brazilian Historic and Geographic Institute. This was part of the Emperor's ambitious larger plan to foster and strengthen a sense of nationalism among Brazil's diverse citizenry—giving them a common identity and history as residents of a unique Portuguese-speaking empire, surrounded by Hispanic-American Republics. The initial resurgence of interest in Cabral had resulted from the rediscovery, in 1839, of his resting place by the Brazilian historian Francisco Adolfo de Varnhagen (later Viscount of Porto Seguro). The completely neglected state in which Cabral's tomb was found nearly led to a diplomatic crisis between Brazil and Portugal—the latter then ruled by Pedro II's eldest sister, Maria II.

In 1871, the Brazilian Emperor—then on a trip to Europe—visited Cabral's gravesite and proposed an exhumation for scientific study, which was carried out in 1882. In a second exhumation in 1896, an urn containing earth and bone fragments was allowed to be removed. Although his remains still lay in Portugal, the urn was eventually brought to the old Cathedral of Rio de Janeiro in Brazil on 30 December 1903. Cabral has since become a national hero in Brazil. In Portugal, however, he has been much overshadowed by his rival Vasco da Gama. Historian William Greenlee argued that Cabral's exploration is important "not only because of its position in the history of geography but because of its influence on the history and economics of the period." Though he acknowledges that few voyages have "been of greater importance to posterity", he also says that "few have been less appreciated in their time." Nevertheless, historian James McClymont affirmed that "Cabral's position in the history of Portuguese conquest and discovery is inexpungable despite the supremacy of greater or more fortunate men." He concluded that Cabral "will always be remembered in history as the chief, if not the first discoverer of Brazil."

=== Intentional discovery hypothesis ===
A controversy that has occupied scholars for more than a century concerns whether Cabral's discovery was by chance or intentional. The latter would mean that the Portuguese at least suspected that land existed to the west. The question was first broached by Emperor Pedro II in 1854 during a session of the Brazilian Historic and Geographic Institute, when he asked if the discovery might have been intentional.

Until the 1854 conference, the widespread presumption was that the discovery had been an accident. Early works on the subject supported this view, including História do Descobrimento e Conquista da Índia (History of the Discovery and Conquest of India, published in 1541) by Fernão Lopes de Castanheda, Décadas da Ásia (Decades of Asia, 1552) by João de Barros, Crônicas do Felicíssimo Rei D. Manuel (Chronicles of the most fortunate D. Manuel, 1558) by Damião de Góis, Lendas da Índia (Legends of India, 1561) by Gaspar Correia, História do Brasil (History of Brazil, 1627) by friar Vicente do Salvador and História da América Portuguesa (History of Portuguese America, 1730) by Sebastião da Rocha Pita.

The first work to advocate the idea of intentionality was published in 1854 by Joaquim Noberto de Sousa e Silva, after Pedro II had opened the debate. Since then, several scholars have subscribed to that view, including Francisco Adolfo de Varnhagen, Capistrano de Abreu, Pedro Calmon, Fábio Ramos and Mário Barata. Historian Hélio Vianna affirmed that "although there are signs of the intentionality" in Cabral's discovery, "based mainly in the knowledge or previous suspicion of the existence of lands at the edge of the South Atlantic", there are no irrefutable proofs to support it. This opinion is also shared by historian Thomas Skidmore. The debate on whether it was a deliberate voyage of discovery or not is considered "irrelevant" by historian Charles R. Boxer. Historian Anthony Smith concludes that the conflicting contentions will "probably never be resolved".

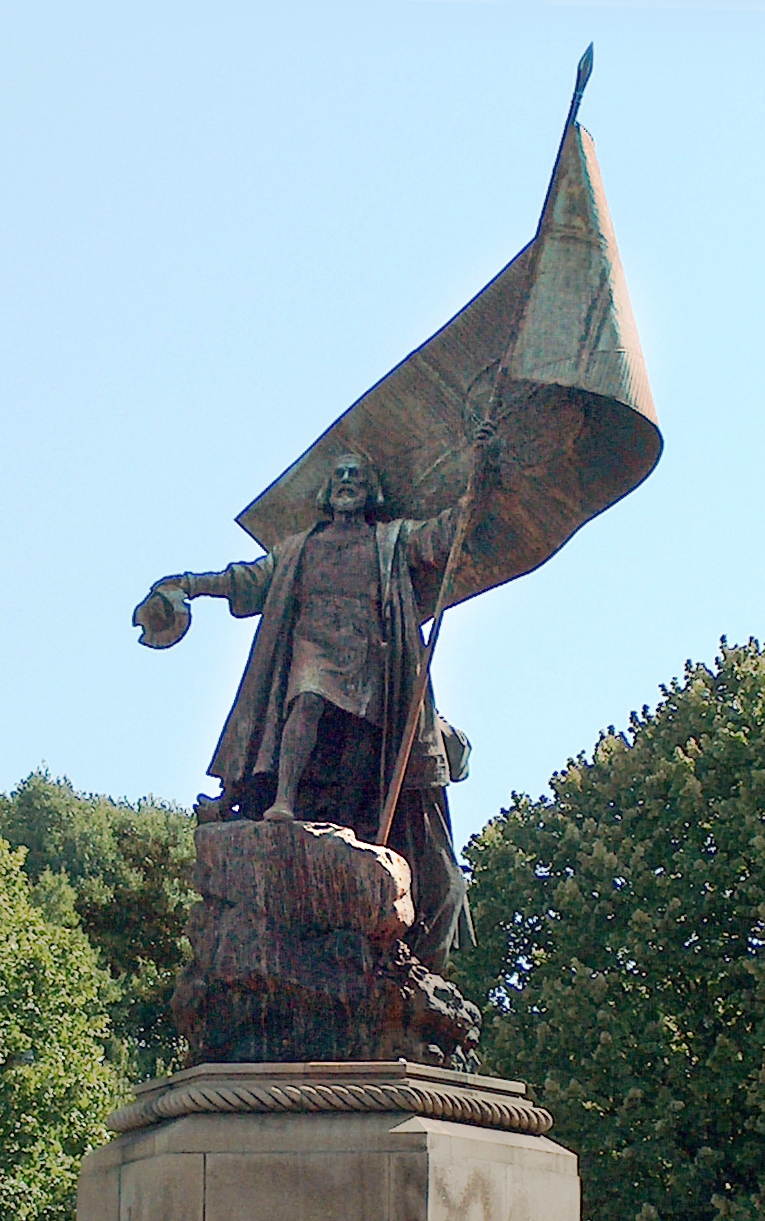
Monument to Cabral, Lisbon

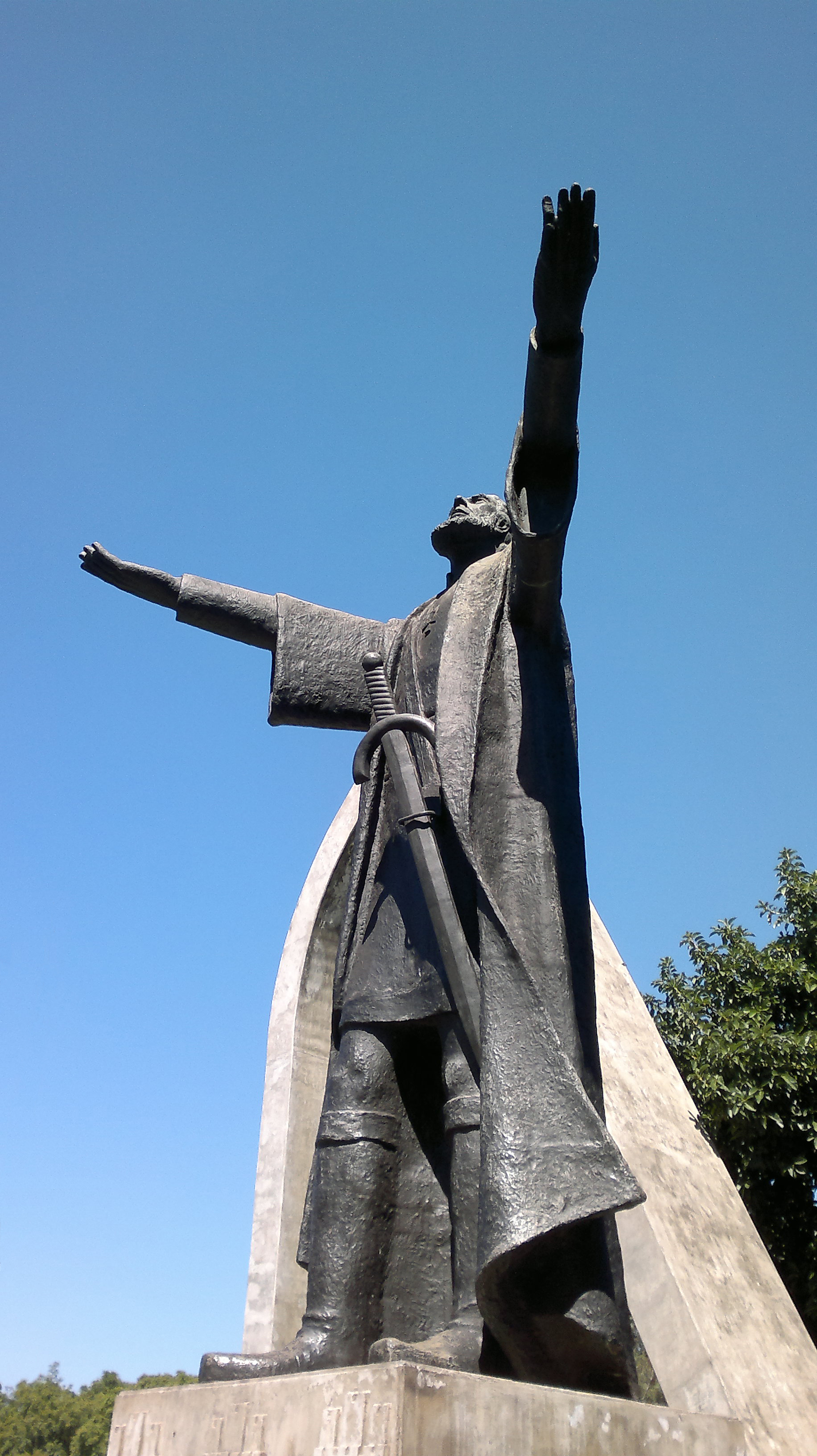
Monument to Cabral, Brazil

=== Forerunners ===
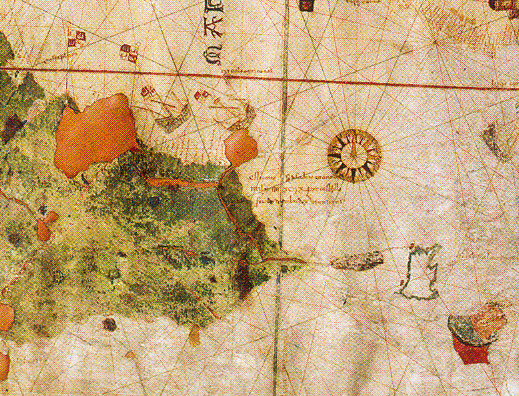
The map of Juan de la Cosa, dated 1500, mentions the travel to northern Brazil by Vicente Yáñez Pinzón.

Cabral was not the first European to stumble upon areas of present-day Brazil, not to mention other parts of South America. Norsemen reached North America and even established settlements, although these ended in failure sometime before the end of the 15th century. Christopher Columbus, on his third voyage to the New World in 1498, traveled along part of what would later become Venezuela.

In the case of Brazil, it was once considered probable that the Portuguese navigator Duarte Pacheco Pereira had made a voyage to the Brazilian coast in 1498. This belief has since been dismissed, however, and it is now thought that he voyaged to North America instead. There is more certain evidence that two Spaniards, Vicente Yáñez Pinzón and Diego de Lepe, traveled along the northern coast of Brazil between January and March 1500. Pinzón went from what is today Cabo de Santo Agostinho (Brazilian state of Pernambuco) to the mouth of the Amazon River. There he encountered another Spanish expedition led by Lepe, which would reach as far as the Oyapock River in March. The reason Cabral is credited with having discovered Brazil, rather than the Spanish explorers, is because the visits by Pinzón and Lepe were cursory and had no lasting impact. (Note: This behavior of the Spanish navigators is understandable given the existence of the Treaty of Tordesillas between Spain and Portugal. Without knowing the exact location of the boundary dividing the hemispheres of colonization, the Spanish navigators, entering Brazilian waters, felt that they were to the east of the boundary meridian.) Historians Capistrano de Abreu, Francisco Adolfo de Varnhagen, Mário Barata and Hélio Vianna concur that the Spanish expeditions did not influence the development of what would become the only Portuguese-speaking nation in the Americas—with a unique history, culture and society which sets it apart from the Hispanic-American societies which dominate the rest of the continent.

== See also ==
- Chronology of European exploration of Asia
- History of Brazil
- History of Portugal
- Portuguese India
- Timeline of European exploration
