= Letter of Pero Vaz de Caminha =

Letter accounting Portuguese arrival to present-day Brazil

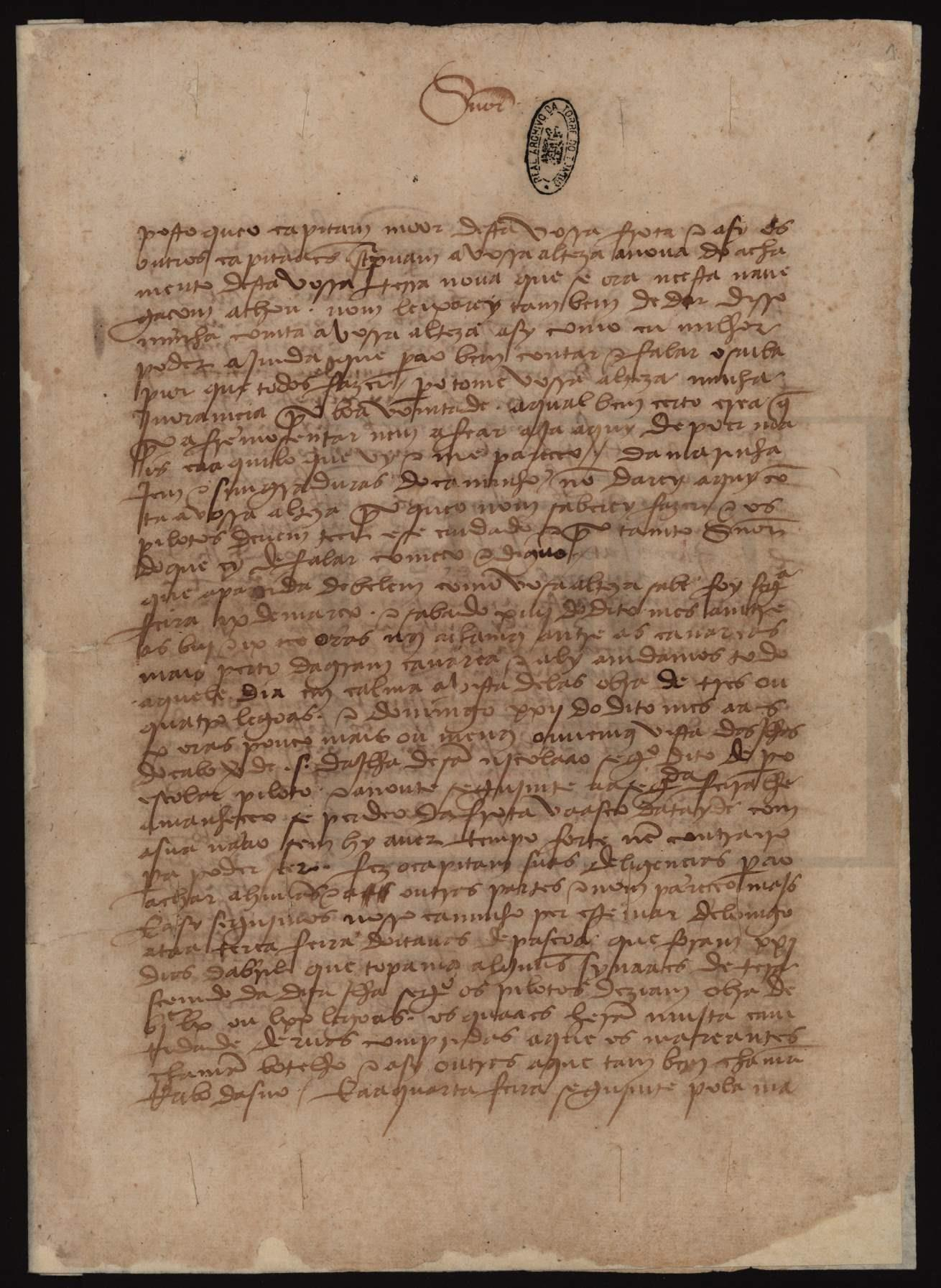
First page of the letter

Signature of Pero Vaz de Caminha

In his letter to Manuel I of Portugal, Pero Vaz de Caminha narrates to the Portuguese king what was then the Europeans’ first encounter with South American natives, alongside what is considered by many today as being one of the most accurate accounts of what Brazil used to look like in 1500. "[...] Esse arvoredo, que é tanto, tamanho, tão basto e de tantas prumagens, que homens as não podem contar.", which roughly translates as "Such vastness of the enormous treeline, with abundant foliage, that is incalculable", is one of Pero's most famous descriptions. He describes in a diary from the first journey from Portugal to Brazil and their arrival in this country. This letter is considered to be the first document of Brazilian history as much as its first literary text. The original of this 27-page document can be found in the Arquivo Nacional da Torre do Tombo, Lisbon.

== Context ==
Manuel I ascended the throne at a time when Portugal was discovering wealth in Africa and the East; he was keen on ensuring Portugal maintained dominance in trade with the East. Portugal had established their presence with enclaves, forts and fortified trading posts.

Pedro Álvares Cabral led the largest fleet in the Portuguese fleet on a mission to Calicut, India, where Vasco da Gama had opened a sea route two years prior. Many historians have debated on the authenticity of this discovery; some have reason to believe that Portugal had prior knowledge of Brazil's existence. Pero Vaz de Caminha was the secretary of this fleet; he had been appointed to be the administrator of a trading post to be created in Calicut. Once Cabral had gathered basic facts and had encountered the native people, he took this information and Caminha's letter on a smaller ship back to Lisbon.

== Contents ==
=== General description of the native people ===
"A feição deles é serem pardos, um tanto avermelhados, de bons rostos e bons narizes, bem feitos. Andam nus, sem cobertura alguma. Nem fazem mais caso de encobrir ou deixa de encobrir suas vergonhas do que de mostrar a cara. Acerca disso são de grande inocência."	They are brown skinned, of a quite reddish complexion, with handsome faces and noses, nicely shaped. They go about naked, without any type of covering. They do not bother to cover their bodies, and show their private parts as readily as they show their faces. In this matter they are of great innocence.
"... andam bem curados, e muito limpos. E naquilo ainda mais me convenço que são como aves, ou alimárias montezinhas, as quais o ar faz melhores penas e melhor cabelo que às mansas, porque os seus corpos são tão limpos e tão gordos e tão formosos que não pode ser mais!"	... they are well groomed and very clean. And in that aspect, I am convinced they are like birds, or mountain animals, to whom the air gives better feathers and hair than those of their domesticated counterparts, because their bodies are as clean and as plump and as beautiful as could be!
"E não comem senão deste inhame, de que aqui há muito, e dessas sementes e frutos que a terra e as árvores de si deitam. E com isto andam tais e tão rijos e tão nédios que o não somos nós tanto, com quanto trigo e legumes comemos."	They only eat this yam (referring to manioc, then unknown to the Europeans), which is very plentiful here, and those seeds and fruits that the earth and the trees give of themselves. Nevertheless, they are sturdier, and sleeker than we are despite all the wheat and legumes we eat.

=== Comments on the native women, comparing them to European women ===
"Ali andavam entre eles três ou quatro moças, bem novinhas e gentis, com cabelos muito pretos e compridos pelas costas; e suas vergonhas, tão altas e tão cerradinhas e tão limpas das cabeleiras que, de as nós muito bem olharmos, não se envergonhavam."	Walking among them there were three or four women, young and gentle, with their hair very black and very long, loose to their backs; their private parts, so prominent and so neat, and so clean of their hairs that they did not get ashamed when we looked at them.
"E uma daquelas moças era toda tingida de baixo a cima, daquela tintura e certo era tão bem feita e tão redonda, e sua vergonha tão graciosa que a muitas mulheres de nossa terra, vendo-lhe tais feições envergonhara, por não terem as suas como ela."	One of those young women had the whole body painted from bottom to top with that tincture, and she was so well-shaped and so rounded, and her private parts so graceful that many women of our land, if they had seen her features, would feel embarrassed for not having theirs look like hers.

=== Other ===
The admiral of the ship that sailed to Brazil sent Nicolau Coelho out to interact with the natives. The people they encountered when they arrived in Brazil lived by a mix of hunting-gathering and agriculture. They were brown and reddish-skinned and completely unclothed. Their languages were divided into four major families with many isolates, and even related languages and dialects were likely to not be mutually intelligible, so they had to communicate through actions and sign languages. They tried to give the natives things to eat such as bread, fish, cakes, honey and even wine. The natives took one taste of the things then spit them all out. They also tried to give them just water but the natives only swashed the water in their mouths, then spit it out. The one thing they did consent to was a cloak they could use to cover themselves while they slept.

== Analysis ==
Apart from being the first ever literary description of Brazil, what sets Caminha's letter apart from other documents like it was his style of writing. Whilst writing this letter, Caminha was not trying to create a literary work but trying to report exactly what he found; it was a detailed commentary on the "customs, religion and physical characteristics of native people." It is devoid of hyperbole and does not use excessive metaphors to validate descriptions. He states things for what they are, not for what he thinks they represent. Other early accounts of the New World emphasized on the idea of prosperity and use adjectives and hyperbole to describe the quantity and quality of its bounty. There is a general tone of optimism that Brazil will provide both spiritual and material gifts. He emphasizes on the "simplicity and good nature" of the indigenous people.

=== Caminha's opinions ===
Caminha did not describe the native Brazilians as bestial and lesser-humans as is common with other early Brazilian narratives. He does not describe them as more or less attractive than they were and seems to be particularly enthralled by their nudity and body paints. He shows "sentiments of admiration, enchantment and protectionism." He believes that they are part of God's creation; he is respectful and understanding them that is why he calls for syncretism instead of enslavement. During the first mass, the native Brazilians responded favorably and thus, to Caminha, are worth saving because "they have no apparent trace of spiritual corruption." There is the assumption that it will be easy to convert indigenous people to Christianity.
