= Bracci =

Bracci is an Italian surname. Notable people with the surname include:

- Cecchino Bracci (real name Francesco de Zanobi Bracci) (1528–1544), Italian, pupil of Michelangelo
- Egisto Bracci (1830–1909), Italian architect, active mainly in Florence
- Faustina Bracci Armellini (1785–1857), Italian pastellist
- Francesco Bracci (1879–1967), Italian Cardinal of the Roman Catholic Church
- François Bracci (1951–2023), French association football manager and former player
- Marco Bracci (born 1966), former Italian volleyball player
- Pietro Bracci (1700–1773), Italian sculptor working in the late Baroque manner
- Renato Bracci (1904–1975), Italian rower who competed in the 1932 Summer Olympics

== Other ==
- Bracci-Cambini, family represents many centuries of Italian history (IX° Sec.)
