= João da Nova =

Portuguese-Galician explorer (1460–1509)

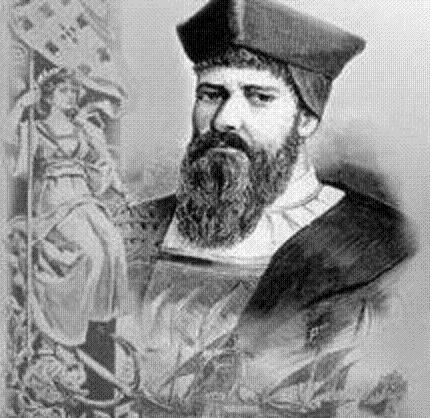
- Born: 1460; Maceda, Galicia, Castile
- Died: July 16, 1509 (aged 48–49); Kochi, Kingdom of Cochin
- Occupation: Explorer
- Known for: Discoverer of Ascension and Saint Helena islands

João da Nova (Galician: Xoán de Novoa, Joam de Nôvoa; Spanish: Juan de Nova; Portuguese pronunciation: [ʒuˈɐ̃w dɐ ˈnɔvɐ]; c. 1460 in Maceda, Ourense, Galicia, Spain – July 16, 1509, in Kochi, India) was a Galician-born explorer in the service of Portugal. He is credited as the discoverer of Ascension and Saint Helena islands.

The Juan de Nova Island, in the Mozambique Channel, is named after him. The Farquhar atoll (in the Seychelles) was, for a long time, known as the João da Nova islands. (Note: The appellation 'João da Nova islands' for the Farquhar atoll appeared in most European navigational charts until the 19th century, when they were renamed after British Mauritius governor Robert Townsend Farquhar, to avoid confusion with the Mozambique Channel island.) It is sometimes thought that the Agaléga islands (in the Indian Ocean) were also named after him (although it is almost certain he never visited them). (Note: Theories behind the 'Agalega' name are reviewed by Robert Scott (1961) Limuria: The Lesser Dependencies of Mauritius)

== Biography ==
Juan da Nova was born into a noble family in Maceda, Galicia, then a constituent kingdom of the Crown of Castile. Nova was sent by his family to Portugal, where he grew up, to escape the struggles between aristocratic factions known as the Irmandiño revolts. In Portugal, he was also known as João Galego ("the Galician"). In 1496, he was appointed as Alcaide menor (mayor) of Lisbon by King Manuel I.

It was only realised around the turn of the millennium that when writing about the discoverer of St Helena, most English sources had incorrectly appended the word “Castella” to his name, i.e., naming him as João da Nova Castella. This error was traced back to an 1817 guidebook by the Town Major of Jamestown, Saint Helena, John Barnes. Just as an earlier author had added the Portuguese word of “Galego” as a suffix to da Nova’s name to indicate the latter was born in the province of Galicia, so it was speculated that Barnes’ handwritten book used the Portuguese word of “Castela” as a suffix to also show that he was born in the kingdom of Castile, this being misspelt by Barnes or his printer as “Castella”, an error that was then repeated by later English authors for nearly the next two centuries.

== First voyage to India ==
The date of João da Nova’s departure from Lisbon as commander of the third Portuguese expedition to India has variously been quoted as 1 March, 5 March, 11 March, 26-27 March or 10 April. He led a small four-vessel fleet under a joint private initiative of Florentine Bartolomeo Marchionni (Note: Bartolomeo Marchionni, possibly the richest man in Lisbon then, was the chief merchant in sugar from Madeira island and had participated extensively in voyages to Guinea, Brazil, Madeira, and would finance several voyages to India.) and Portuguese Álvaro de Bragança. Suggestions that da Nova’s ships were sent to reinforce Cabral’s ships following the outbreak of war with the Calicut kingdom (e.g., “as the plight of the Portuguese at Calicut was acute, three ships were sent on ahead under the Admiral, Joao da Nova Castella, to reinforce de Cabral, the Portuguese commander in India”. ) are now doubted because the Portuguese monarchy was unaware of the outbreak of war at India until the first of Cabral’s ships returned to Lisbon some six months after da Nova sailed from Lisbon. It has been suggested that da Nova was charged to block any attempt by the Spanish to enter the spice trade. If true, given the small size of his fleet, he was entrusted with a very delicate mission.

Two chronicles claimed these ships discovered Ascension Island during the outward voyage, naming it Conception Island. Thus, João de Barros wrote that passing eight degrees beyond the equator, towards the south, an island was found to which the name Concepcão was given whilst Damião de Góis’ later chronicle described the sighting of an island south of the line which was named Conçeicam. There are at least three reasons why it is thought this name was quoted by de Barros in error, this later being repeated by de Góis. First, the Church of Rome has long celebrated the feast of the Immaculate Conception of the Virgin Mary on the fixed date of 8 December, yet by then the third armada had already reached India. Second, the Portuguese Cantino Planisphere, completed in 1502 after the third armada returned, shows the newly sighted island marked as ilha achada e chamada Ascenssam [island found and called Ascension], not as Conception. Third, in 1503 a division of the 4th Portuguese India Armada (Gama, 1502) under Estêvão da Gama also named the island as Ascension, not as Conception. It is usually presumed that the island was discovered on the movable feast of Ascension Day, which fell on 20 May in 1501, 39 days after Easter.

Two sources, a letter from King Manuel I of Portugal and Gaspar Corrêa’s chronicle, made no mention of either Ascension or Conception, instead describing a visit to Brazil.

After doubling the Cape, it is thought da Nova called at Mossel Bay, South Africa. Here he is believed to have picked up letters left in a shoe placed in a conspicuous situation by Pedro de Atayde from the 2nd Portuguese India Armada (Cabral, 1500). This will have been da Nova’s first opportunity to learn he should avoid trade with Calicut, with whom a state of war now existed. It is speculated that the Mossel Bay Stone found after the demolition of the old Government House bears an inscription of João da Nova’s name and provides evidence of this visit It is also believed that da Nova built a hermida or a small hermitage with space for only a few supplicants at a promitory at Mossel Bay. A letter written by Pedro Quaresma to King Manuel II described a visit to this location a few years later in 1506. This same reference source includes a description of the walls of a ruined hermida dedicated to Saint Blaise on the high ground (Cape St Blaise) between two coves at Mossel Bay in 1576. Later in his outward voyage, Da Nova is also said to have discovered what has since been called Juan de Nova Island in the Mozambique Channel.

Arriving in India, Nova established a feitoria (trading post) in Cannanore and left behind a factor (on behalf of the private Marchionni-Braganza consortium, not the Portuguese crown). On December 31, 1501, João da Nova's little fleet engaged the fleet of the Zamorin of Calicut in a battle outside of Cannanore harbor, the first Portuguese naval battle in the Indian Ocean. In this action, João da Nova’s four ships won a memorable sea battle, largely due to their superior cannonry and one of the earliest combinations of line-ahead and standoff gun battle tactics. In 1898, a large 20-ton boulder was discovered at the bottom of the old Breakwater Office building at the site in the Fort of Colombo, Sri Lanka. This featured a finely produced carving of the Portuguese coat of arms, above which was carved a cross and to one side a cruder carving, apparently of the numerals “1501”. Some historians have conjectured that Nova (or one of his captains) visited Sri Lank at some point on this trip, four years before the first officially documented Portuguese visit by D. Lourenço de Almeida in 1505-6. However, an alternative suggestion made in the 1899 paper by F. H. de Vos tentatively suggested that the characters might be read as “ISOI” representing a phrase such as Jesus Salvator Orientalium Indicorum [Jesus the Saviour of the East Indies].

Nova's armada left India around the turn of 1501/2. On his return journey, Nova is commonly said to have discovered the South Atlantic island of Saint Helena on 21 May 1502, the feast day of Helena of Constantinople. However, a paper published in 2015 reviewed the discovery date and suggests Jan Huyghen van Linschoten was probably the first (in 1596) to state that the island was so named because it was found on the 21 May. Given that Linschoten correctly stated Whitsunday fell on the Western Christian date of 21 May 1589 (rather than the Orthodox Church date of 28 May), the paper suggests that Linschoten was referring to the Protestant feast-day for Saint Helena on 21 May, not the Orthodox Church version on the same date. It is then argued the Portuguese found the island two decades before the start of the Reformation and the establishment of Protestantism, and it is therefore not possible that the island was so named because it was found on the Protestant feast day. An alternative discovery date of 3 May on the Catholic feast-day celebrating the finding of the True Cross by Saint Helena in Jerusalem, as quoted by Odoardo Duarte Lopes in 1591 and by Sir Thomas Herbert in 1638, is suggested as historically more credible than the Protestant date of 21 May. The paper observes that if da Nova made the discovery on 3 May 1502, he may have been inhibited from naming the island Ilha de Vera Cruz (Island of the True Cross) because Pedro Álvares Cabral had already assigned that same name to the Brazilian coastline, which he thought to be a large island, on 3 May 1500. News of Cabral’s discovery reached Lisbon directly from South America before da Nova’s fleet set off on the voyage to India in 1501. If da Nova knew the True Cross name had already been assigned, the most obvious and plausible alternative name for him to give the island was "Santa Helena".

The tradition that da Nova discovered Saint Helena has been reviewed by a 2022 paper which concluded the Portuguese chronicles published at least 50 years later, are the sole primary source to the discovery. Although contradictory in describing other events, these chronicles almost unanimously claim João da Nova found St Helena sometime in 1502, although none quote the precise date. However, there are several reasons for doubting da Nova made this discovery. First, given that da Nova either returned on 11 September or 13 September 1502 it is usually assumed the Cantino planisphere completed by the following November includes his discovery of Ascension Island (shown as an archipelago with one of six islands marked as "ilha achada e chamada Ascenssam"), yet this map fails to show St Helena. Second, when a section of the Fourth Armada under the command of Estêvão da Gama sighted and landed at St Helena the following year on 30 July 1503 its scrivener Thomé Lopes regarded it as an unknown island yet named Ascension as one of five reference points to the new island’s location. On 12 July 1502, nearly three weeks before reaching St Helena, Lopes described how Estêvão da Gama’s ships met up with a section of the Fifth Armada led by Afonso de Albuquerque off the Cape of Good Hope. The latter left Lisbon about six months after João da Nova’s return so Albuquerque and his captains should all have known whether João da Nova had indeed found St Helena. An anonymous Flemish traveler on one of da Gama's ships reporting that bread and victuals were running short by the time they reached the Cape, so from da Gama's perspective there was a pressing need that he be told water and meat could be found at St Helena. The fact that nothing seems to have been said about the island, da Gama's scrivener Lopes regarding the island as unknown, again implies da Nova found Ascension but not St Helena. The 2022 paper also reviews cartographic evidence that St Helena and Ascension were known to the Spanish in 1500, before either João da Nova or Estêvão da Gama sailed for India. The suggestion that João da Nova discovered Tristan da Cunha naming it St Helena is discounted.

== Second voyage to India ==
=== 1505-06 ===
On 5 March 1505, he undertook another voyage to India as captain of the Flor de la Mar in the 7th Portuguese India armada commanded by Francisco de Almeida, the first Portuguese Viceroy of India. Nova had been granted credentials by the king entitling him to be Captain-Major (Portuguese: Capitão-mor) of the Indian coast fleet if suitable. In East Africa, the armada captured Kilwa (in which event Nova played a critical role relaying secret missives between Almeida and local pretender Muhammad Arcone) and proceeded to raid Mombassa.

After crossing the Indian Ocean, the armada spent some time erecting forts and raiding ports, before eventually arriving at Cochin in October. There D. Francisco de Almeida inaugurated his term as Viceroy of Portuguese India, but refused to allow João da Nova to invoke his credentials as Captain-Major of the Indian coastal patrol. Almeida claimed that the Flor de la Mar was too large to enter the Indian coastal inlets and lagoons and thus unsuitable as a patrol ship. Almeida offered João da Nova the option of switching to a caravel, and sending the Flor back under another captain, but Nova chose to bring her back to Lisbon himself. Almeida then appointed his own son, Lourenço de Almeida, as captain-major of the patrol.

Leaving India in February 1506, Nova's heavy-laden Flor de la Mar, developed a leak in the hull in the environs of Zanzibar and was forced to stop for repairs in the islands of the Mozambique Channel. He would spend the next eight months in the area repairing the ship, a delay prolonged by illness and contrary winds.

=== 1507 ===
He was still stranded with his leaky ship in February, 1507, when the 8th Armada, under command of Tristão da Cunha, arrived in Mozambique Island. Cunha helped complete the repairs, transferred its cargo to a Lisbon-bound transport, and annexed Nova and the Flor de la Mar into his own India-bound fleet.

João da Nova took part in the Portuguese capture of Socotra in August 1507. Much to his surprise, he was assigned to remain in Socotra with the Red Sea patrol, a detachment of six ships under D. Afonso de Albuquerque's command, rather than continue with Cunha on to India. But his presence in the Red Sea patrol turned out to be a disturbance to Albuquerque, even if his exact role in the subsequent "mutiny of the captains" may have been somewhat murky. Besides his own frustrations, Nova regaled fellow patrol captains with tales of Indian riches, a much more attractive option than the barren coasts of Arabia they were assigned to patrol. In August–September, 1507, Albuquerque led his little squad into the Gulf of Oman and began to raid a series of coastal cities in succession - Qalhat, Qurayyat, Muscat - signalling his intention to proceed in this manner all the way up the Arabian coast and across to the island of Hormuz. The patrol captains, who were lured to the East Indies with dreams of quick and easy riches, balked at the prospect of a tiring succession of profitless, dangerous fights with insufficient men-at-arms. After Muscat, the exhausted João da Nova submitted a formal request to Albuquerque for permission to leave the patrol and proceed to India (ostensibly to request reinforcements from the viceroy Almeida). When this was denied, Nova protested and was placed under arrest. He was later pardoned and released, as his command was needed for the Battle of Hormuz in October, 1507.

=== 1508 ===
Shortly after the battle, Nova once again was at the center of a renewed series of complaints, this time over the establishment of a fortress in the city of Hormuz. In early 1508, during the construction of the fortress, three of the patrol ships slipped away from Albuquerque's sight and set sail to India, intending to lodge formal complaints against Albuquerque with the vice-roy Francisco de Almeida in Cochin. João da Nova was not among them, but Albuquerque nonetheless decided to let him go as well, hoping that by this belated magnanimous gesture, Nova might argue on his behalf. He didn't. Once in Cochin, João da Nova joined the three other captains in opening a formal case against Albuquerque.

=== 1509 ===
João da Nova fought in the Battle of Diu in February 1509, his ship, the Flor de la Mar, being used by the vice-roy Francisco de Almeida as the flagship of the Portuguese battle fleet. In March of that year, Afonso de Albuquerque, by then in Cochin himself, invoked his own secret credentials to relieve Francisco de Almeida as governor of India. But João da Nova, along with the other captains, assembled a petition demanding that Almeida refused to yield it, characterizing Albuquerque as unfit to govern. In May of the same year, Almeida formally opened a council in Cochin to consider the reception of Albuquerque. Nova and the other patrol captains presented the case against him.

João da Nova died shortly after, in July 1509, just a couple of weeks before Almeida delivered the indictment and ordered Albuquerque's arrest. In spite of all this, Albuquerque is said to have personally paid for Nova's funeral in memory of his achievements in the Hormuz campaign.

== See also ==
- 4th Portuguese India Armada (Gama, 1502)
- 7th Portuguese India Armada (Almeida, 1505)
- Exploration of Asia
- List of maritime explorers
- First Luso-Malabarese War

== Sources ==
- de Albuquerque, Afonso (1877). The Commentaries of the Great Afonso Dalboquerque, Second Viceroy of India. Translated by Walter de Gray Birch.
