= Bartolomeo Marchionni =

Florentine merchant

Bartolomeo Marchionni (late 15th to early 16th century) was a Florentine merchant established in Lisbon during the Age of Discovery.

Bartolomeo Marchionni arrived circa 1468 at Lisbon as an agent to the Cambini. In a long career he became the most successful merchant and one of the richest men in Lisbon at the time. He was the chief merchant in sugar from Madeira islands and participated extensively in the voyages to Guinea, Brazil, Madeira, and would finance several voyages to India In 1500, in a joint enterprise with Dom Álvaro of Portugal and Girolamo Sernigi, Bartolomeo Marchionni sent a ship second fleet to India that discovered Brazil under the command of Pedro Álvares Cabral. In 1501 he financed the third Portuguese armada (expedition) to India, under a joint private initiative with Portuguese Dom Álvaro of Braganza. The small four vessel fleet departed from Lisbon in 9 or 10 March 1501, under command of João da Nova, having Diogo Barbosa as Dom Álvaro agent. They established a feitoria (trading post) in Cananor, leaving there a factor. He was a friend of Americo Vespucci. He was followed by his son Pêro Paulo Marchionni, himself a shipowner. In the 1503 fleet to India under Francisco and Afonso de Albuquerque, Giovanni da Empoli was sent as a commercial agent of the firms Gualterroti and Frescobaldi and also Bartolomeo Marchionni.
