= Fort Anjediva =

Building in India

- Part of Goa
- West Coast, India
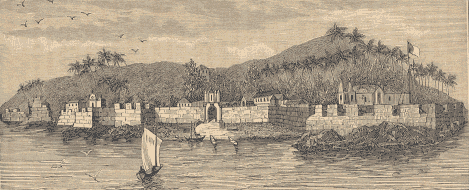
- Fort Anjediva

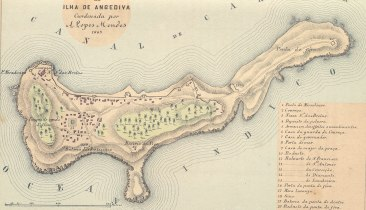
- Map of the Anjediva Island

Site information
- Type: Fort
- Owner: Government of Goa
- Controlled by: India
- Open to the public: Restricted
- Condition: Ruins

Location
- Location within Karnataka Location within India
- Coordinates: 14.75987°N 74.11048°E

Site history
- Built: 1505
- Built by: Dom Francisco de Almeida of the Portuguese.
- Materials: Granite Stones and mud
- Demolished: Yes

Garrison information
- Garrison: Indian Navy
- Occupants: Indian Navy

Fort Anjediva, built on the Anjadip Island, off the coast of the Indian state of Karnataka but under the administrative jurisdiction of the Indian state of Goa, was once under Portuguese rule. The island of Anjadip has an area of 1.5 square kilometres (0.58 mi^{2}).

Though the fort has a rich history linked to rule in Portuguese India, the fort is presently in ruins. The historic church on the island in its vicinity, the Church of Our Lady of Springs, was built in 1505. The Chapel of Francis of Assisi is also located here, but it is in ruins.

== History ==
Because of its strategic importance in the seafaring route to India and also as a watering destination for ships, a fort was built on Anjadip island by the Portuguese to enhance their military presence and control of the Eastern trade route.

In March 1505, Dom Francisco de Almeida came to India to serve as the Viceroy for the Portuguese monarch Emanuel I, and was the first permanent Portuguese representative in Asia. He had a “Regimento” or mandatory orders to establish four forts in India, which included the fort at Anjadip island, off the West Coast of India (the other three forts were proposed at Cannanore, Cochin and Quilon) where seafaring merchant vessels from Greece, Arabia, Egypt, and Portugal would stop for water on their way to and from the East carrying valuable goods, such as spices from India.

=== Location ===
The decision to build the fort was dictated by the fact that Vasco da Gama had stopped on this island in 1498, on his return from Calicut to Portugal, (after exploring the sea route to India) not only to repair his ships but also to collect water from the springs on the island (considered of good water quality). He had again stopped here in 1502. It is stated that Vasco da Gama had appreciated, from his earlier visits to this island, that Angediva would be a good place not only to collect fresh and safe water but would also be a perfect safe site for docking ships during the southwest monsoon season in India. In fact, Vasco da Gama and Gaspar da Gama (a Jewish trader who was converted to Christianity in Cochin) recommended to the King of Portugal to establish a naval fort at Angediva, which eventually could help Portuguese to get control of the neighbouring island of Goa.

Hydrographic conditions

Further, the hydrographic conditions at the island location of about 1 mile (2 km) length, and 2 miles (3 km) from its shore to the Karwar head southwards, favoured building a safe fort as water depth of 6 to 7 fathoms (11 to 13 m) in the channel between the fort wall and the shore line was noted. At the outer sea side of the fort, the water depth was reported to be 10 to 12 fathoms (18 to 22 m). A further 4 miles (6 km) away, the depth of water was reportedly 14 fathoms (26 m).

=== Construction ===
Almeida took up the task of building the fort so seriously that he even declined an invitation from King of Bisnaga (Vijayanagara), a staunch ally of the Portuguese. As soon as he landed in Angedipa on 13 September 1505, he started building the fort with enthusiasm. The Vijayanagara emperor or his local vassal, the chieftain of Gerosopa, did not object to the fort building activity. Construction materials such as timber, cane, palm leaves, and lime were readily supplied by the local people. An ancient temple on the island is said to have been demolished to extract stones for use on the fort. Its completion time has been recorded variously; as 21 days and also as three months. It was also claimed that during excavations of the foundations for the fort a stone bearing a Cross was found, which was interpreted to mean that the island was once a habitat of Christians.

The fort wall was built on barren and rocky surface and fortified by towers. The fort was built at a huge cost, as it provided military defence fortifications to defend the Portuguese colonial interests in India. The fort walls were mostly built with clay and stone, since there was shortage of limestone and other materials on the island. Still, the fort as built was considered a good base for the military exchanges with the enemy.

== Military use ==
After the fort was built, the colonial Portuguese used it for a year, mainly as a military establishment and as a regular watering stop for their ships.

The military operations launched from this location helped Almeida subdue initial enemies like Timoja (a Hindu privateer who served the Vijayanagara Empire and later became of great help for the Portuguese). Subsequently, when Adil Shah of Bijapur attacked with a large force, there was intense bombardment and fierce strategic attacks in which the Viceroy's son D. Lourenço also took part. After four days of intense fighting, Adil Shah of Bijapur retreated. But in the bargain, the Portuguese had suffered losses and even Almeida was injured. Subsequent to this victory, there was a rethink on the utility of the fort as a defence structure and was, therefore, abandoned. But a story that Almeida demolished the fort in 1506, as it was built on 13 September, an inauspicious day, is not borne out by the fact that the fort was revived as a Portuguese defence establishment during Viceroy Albuquerque’s (successor to Almeida) time and the fort ruins are still seen in the island.

The decision to abandon the fort in 1506 was because the garrisons were better placed at Cannnaore and Cochin forts, which could ensure adequate protection to the trade. Another factor considered in abandoning the fort was on account of maintenance problems (operating from Cochin as the base), localized bad weather, and fear of enemy attack from Goa.

== Later uses ==
The fort was refurbished in 1682 by the Viceroy Count of Alvor. It was populated by about 600 people with facilities of a seminary, a Jesuit college and a Portuguese school. In 1768, it was under the administrative control of a governor when 350 people lived here.

In 1812, the inhabitants counted 782 (including convicts). But, when the fear from any kind of enemy threat receded, in 1843 the Portuguese abandoned the fort once again.

When Fort Anjediva was within Portuguese India, it was used as a refuge by Christians and Hindus from the mainland during the invasion by the coastal kingdom of Bednore and Tipu Sultan.

The island and its fort site became a part of India on December 19, 1961, with the success of "Operation Vijay", a military operation in which the Portuguese were evicted from their colony in Goa, as well as their other Indian colonies.

== Archaeological findings ==
Excavations carried out in the area by the Department of Archaeology and Museums (Goa) has revealed pillars, stones, and pots of the 11th and 12th centuries with the artistic work of Kadambas and Chalukyas. From this, it has been inferred that the findings could be the remnants of the ruined temple of goddess Aryadurga Devi.

== Access ==
In the past, the approach involved a seaward journey of one hour by trawlers and then by a canoe to the island.

Fort Anjediva and the island are located 4 kilometres (2.5 mi) south of Baticala, Karwar. Karwar is on National Highway NH 17. From Karwar, a 2-kilometre (1.2 mi) causeway leads to the Officers Gate (Sea Bird gate), and then on to the historic fort.

It is also approachable by boat ride from the Binga beach.

== See also ==
- Colonial Goa
- Portuguese forts in India
