= Girolamo Sernigi =

Girolamo Sernigi (1453- after 1510) was an Italian merchant, originally from Florence, based in Lisbon, Portugal. Circa 1500, Florentine merchants were the most prominent foreign group active in Lisbon's economic life and played an important role in the financing of Portuguese maritime expeditions in search of new products and markets. Sernigi himself was a part owner of one of the ships of Pedro Álvares Cabral's fleet, and was in contact with members of the first Portuguese expeditions sailing to India around the Cape of Good Hope, such as Gonçalo Coelho and Gaspar da Gama.

Sernigi is remembered today as the author of letters in which he reported news of the overseas exploration to his relatives and associates back in Florence, and which became some of the most detailed accounts of the Portuguese expeditions of the period.

In 1510, he personally commanded a ship going to Malacca.
