= Diogo Kopke =

Portuguese mathematician and publisher

Diogo Kopke (1808–1844) was a Portuguese editor and publisher, mathematician, journalist and soldier of German descent. He was the first person to publish the only existing contemporary report of Vasco da Gama’s first trip to India.

== Background ==
In the mid-17th century, the Kopke family controlled a significant portion of trade in Hamburg and, consequently, enjoyed considerable prestige in the context of the Hanseatic League, then composed of the free cities of Bremen, Lübeck, Danzig and Hamburg. In 1636, Nicholas Kopke became the first Consul General of the Hanseatic League in the Portuguese capital, Lisbon, and soon after he established a branch of his business in Porto. Around 1730, Christian Kopke took up permanent residence in Porto, and became the Hanseatic League consul there. He married there and the many members of the Kopke family who have since lived in Porto are descended from him. The family became particularly well known as exporters of port wine.

The family's records were destroyed by a fire in 1888 but it appears that Diogo Kopke was born in Porto on 16 February 1805, although other sources suggest 1808. He was the son of Diogo Kopke and Ana Barbosa Ayalla. He went to school in England and continued his studies at the University of Coimbra, where he graduated in mathematics.

== Military career ==
After schooling Kopke joined the army. In 1828 he went into exile, after having participated in the Liberal revolt in Porto on 16 May of that year. While in exile in France and England, he used the library at Rennes and collaborated with a local newspaper in Plymouth. Back in Portugal, he commanded several batteries during the Siege of Porto (1832-1833) and distinguished himself at the Battle of Asseiceira, being promoted to become Captain of the IV Artillery.

== Mathematics ==
Kopke worked as a lecturer in mathematics at the Academica Politecnica do Porto. His particular interests were trigonometry, geodesy and theoretical and practical navigation, together with the use of astronomical instruments. He also taught at the Royal Academy of Navy and Commerce of Porto. It is likely that he was the source of Joseph James Forrester’s knowledge on trigonometry. He accompanied Forrester on trips up the Douro river that led to the preparation of two well-received topographical maps of the region and he reviewed Forrester's work.

== Publishing ==
Kopke was active as a journalist and wrote for various magazines, such as Diario do Governo, Gazeta Medica do Porto, and Museu Portuense. His teaching work gave him the time to edit and publish various historical texts. He made a catalogue of unpublished documents in the Porto Municipal Library and then, together with António da Costa Paiva, published the most notable. These included a text by João de Castro the fourth Viceroy of Portuguese India and one by the mathematician José Anastácio da Cunha. In 1838 he was the first person to publish the Journal of Vasco Da Gama's trip of 1497. Added to the UNESCO Memory of the World register in 2013, this is the only surviving text about the journey, purported to have been written by two sailors who accompanied Da Gama, Álvaro Velho and João de Sá. Kopke often wrote long forewords or afterwords to the documents he published.

=== Editorial work and other publications ===
The publications written or edited and published by Kopke included:

- Catalogo da Bibliotheca publica municipal do Porto. (Catalogue of the Public Municipal Library of Porto)
- Carta Fisico matematica sobre a teoria da polvara em geral, e teoria do melhor comprimedo dos peços em particular. (Mathematical physics and gunpowder theory in general, and on the best length of pieces in particular). Written by Jose Anastacio da Cunha in 1760, published in 1838.
- Diogo Kopke and Antonio da Costa Paiva (eds.), Roteiro da viagem que em descobrimento da India pelo Cabo da Boa Esperança fez dom Vasco da Gama em 1497: Segundo um manuscripto da Bibliotheca publica portuense. (Itinerary of the voyage that in discovery of India by the Cape of Good Hope made D. Vasco da Gama in 1497; according to a contemporary manuscript, existing at the Biblioteca Publica Portuense, Porto,). . 1838
- Quadro geral da historia portuguesa, segundo os epocas de sua revolucoes nacionais. (General framework of Portuguese history, according to the times of its national revolutions). 1840.
- Tratado breve dos rios de Guiné de Cabo Verde, desde o rio do Sanagá até aos baixos de Sant’Ana. (Brief treatise of the Guinea rivers of Cape Verde, from the Sanagá river to the Sant'Ana lowlands). By captain André Alvares de Almada. 1841.
- Primeiro roteiro da costa do India desde Goa ate Diu, narrando a viagem que fez vice-rei Dom Garcia de Noronha em socorro desta ultima cidade. (First tour of the Coast of India from Goa to Diu, narrating the trip made by Viceroy D. Garcia de Noronha in aid of this last city). By D. João de Castro. 1843
- Apartamentos arquelologias. (Archaeological notes). 1849. published posthumously

== Death ==
Kopke died on 25 February 1844 in Porto.
