= Church of Our Lady of Springs =

Church in India

- Igreja de Nossa Senhora das Brotas (Portuguese)
- The church with its altar
- Interactive map of the Church of Our Lady of Springs area

General information
- Architectural style: Portuguese Baroque
- Location: Anjediva Island, Goa, India
- Coordinates: 14.761°N 74.111°E
- Construction started: AD 1502
- Completed: AD 1502, AD 1506, and AD 1729

The Church of Our Lady of Springs (Portuguese: Igreja de Nossa Senhora das Brotas) is located in the vicinity of the Fort Anjediva on the Anjadip Island, off the west Coast of India under the administrative control of Goa, India. Initially, in 1502, it was built as a small thatched chapel, but later, in 1506, was made into a more permanent structure. It was rebuilt in 1682 and subsequently refurbished in 1729. An Insignia awarded by Rome as the ‘Mother Church’ is seen in this church.

This church is stated to be the oldest Christian church in India, outside of Kerala and visited by devotees from Karwar, Binaga and other villages of Karnataka and Goa.

The ancient church was under the control of the Vicar of the diocese of Karwar, facing the city of Goa. The church is now under the ownership of the Government of Goa but is administered by the Indian Navy who are in possession of the island to build a strategic naval base.

== History ==
History of the church is dated to 22 August 1502 when Fr Henrique de Coimbra with other eight Franciscans, landed at Anjadipa Island as part of the second Portuguese expedition under the leadership of Pedro Álvares Cabral. A makeshift chapel was built in 1502 and first mass in Goa was held there. A permanent church was built at the same location in 1506. The present church was re-built in 1729.

The other landmark on the island is the Chapel of St Francis located near this Church, which has not been refurbished and is mostly in ruins.

== Restoration ==
The Church of Lady of Springs has been restored and festivals are held here every year, mainly because of the assistance of the people (of both Christian and Hindu community) of Karwar, Sirsi and Binaga. The Parish Priest of St Annes Church at Binaga, Fr Britto D Silva, and the former Parish Priest Fr. Kurien, who earned the sobriquet of "Anjedivacho Pisso", coordinated efforts to restore the church to some of its past glory.

== Pilgrimage ==
Until recently, Goan Catholics from all parts of the world have been visiting this "Brotas" church on pilgrimage for worship. After the Indian Navy took over the island to establish 'Project Sea Bird' (a naval base project), disputes have cropped up on allowing pilgrims to visit the churches here, since the area is now considered a military ‘high security’ zone. It is claimed that when the Government of Goa handed over the island in December 1987 to the Indian Navy there was a stipulation that pilgrims would be allowed to visit the Church of Our Lady of Springs and the Chapel of St Francis D’Assissi on the island, particularly on feast days on 2 February and 4 October. The issue has remained unresolved although the Navy continues to grant permission on a year-to-year basis. The issue has been raised in the Indian Parliament by MP Rajya Sabha, who demands that devotees should be allowed to celebrate the religious festivals every year on the two Islands.

To resolve the situation, it has been suggested that the numbers of pilgrims be controlled, access be restricted to only those who are issued a photo identity card by the Government of Goa, only one group of pilgrims be allowed to visit at a time, and just one mass be held in the Church.

== Access ==
The Church on Anjadip Island is located 4 kilometres (2.5 mi), south of Baticala, the ancient kingdom of Garsopa, in present-day Karwar. Karwar is approached by the National Highway NH 17. From Karwar, a 2 kilometres (1.2 mi) causeway leads to the Officers (Sea Bird) gate and then to the historic church. The church is also approachable by boat ride from the Binga beach. In the past, the approach involved a trip of one hour by trawler and then by canoe to the island.
