= Gaspar da Gama =

Polish interpreter (c. 1444 - c. 1510)

Gaspar da Gama, also known as Gaspar da India and Gaspar de Almeida (c. 1444 – c. 1510), was an interpreter (língua in old Portuguese) and guide to several Portuguese exploratory fleets. He was of Jewish origin and was probably born in Poznań in the Kingdom of Poland. In 1498 he was taken captive aboard Vasco da Gama's fleet on its return voyage to Portugal from India. He was known to speak multiple languages including Hebrew and Chaldean, as well as a mixture of Italian and Spanish.

== Biography ==
=== Before meeting the Portuguese ===
He appears with the name "Gaspar da Gama" or "Gaspar of the Indies" in the chronicles and reports of discovery written by Gaspar Correia, Fernão Lopes de Castanheda, Jerónimo Osório, Damião de Góis and Álvaro Velho but was known to Indians as Mahmet. Correia states that he was a Castilian named Alonso Perez. Some sources confuse him with Gaspar de Lemos, a Portuguese sailor who commanded a ship in the fleet that discovered Brazil. Other sources also call him "Gaspar de Almeida" given his friendship with Francisco de Almeida, 1st Viceroy of India.

There are several versions of his life before meeting Vasco da Gama in India. Some of these were sourced at Gaspar da Gama himself, but he probably tried to hide some "inconvenient" facts about his own past. According to Gaspar's own account, he became a Jewish traveller, making his way to Jerusalem, and then Alexandria, where he was taken prisoner and sold as a slave in India, in India he secured his freedom in the service of the ruler of Goa. The chronicler Gaspar Correia states that, when found by the Portuguese, Gaspar da Gama was Captain of the fleet of Yusuf Adil Shah, the Sultan of Bijapur, Arab governor of Goa in India. Damião de Góis says Gaspar da Gama was a Jew born in the city of Poznań in the Kingdom of Poland and that at that time he did not speak Spanish, but the Venetian language, the very language used in European-based commercial centers in the East.

=== Controversy ===
The historian João de Barros, reports that Gaspar da Gama informed him that his parents were from Bosna (or Posner, i.e., Poznań) in Poland. His parents migrated to Jerusalem and then to Alexandria, where Gaspar da Gama was born. The Israeli journalist Elias Lipiner studied the documentation of the Portuguese chroniclers of the Age of Discovery and considered João de Barros version to be the most faithful to facts, suggesting that Gaspar da Gama must have been born in Alexandria around 1458. Following Jewish Radhanite trade routes at the time, he went at a very young age to India where he established himself as a merchant. Other historians, such as the scholar of Brazilian Jewish history Arnold Wiznitzer, think he was born in Granada or circa 1440 in Bosnia (perhaps confusion with the name of Poznań).

=== Meeting the Portuguese ===
In 1498, when the returning Vasco da Gama fleet landed on the island of Angediva, about 20 miles off the coast of Goa, Gaspar da Gama, uninvited, went on the ship of Vasco da Gama and asked happily to go aboard, to visit his native Spain. He was then more than 50 years age, with a white beard and louder and clear manners than that of the Indians of region. As reported by Álvaro Velho, clerk of the Portuguese fleet, Gaspar da Gama said that he was "working for a powerful lord who owns an army of more than 40 thousand horsemen, and that upon hearing of their arrival he had asked to see them. If not he would have died of sadness."

Vasco da Gama pretended to believe, and discreetly sent men to Anjadip Island to get information about the visitor. Some reliable merchants told that he was a spy, preparing a surprise attack. Upon this, Vasco da Gama had the visitor whipped and interrogated under torture. After having hot oil dropped on his skin, Gaspar da Gama told he was a Jew from Granada who had converted to Christianity and after traveling to Turkey and Mecca went to the Indies, and that there was no plan to attack the Portuguese. After 12 days of interrogation, Vasco da Gama came to rely more on the prisoner. He gave him a cheese and two soft breads and Gaspar da Gama told him that, after all, he was very happy to find these "Franks".

Vasco da Gama kept Gaspar as a prisoner and took him on the eventful trip back to Portugal, perhaps considering that his knowledge of the East would be useful. During the long return, Gaspar da Gama befriended the Portuguese, and especially Vasco da Gama. He was baptized the following year, Vasco da Gama being his godfather and giving him his own surname. The first name—Gaspar—had been chosen as a reference to its origins, being the name of one of three Magi from the East who visited Jesus.

=== In Portugal and back to India ===
King Manuel I of Portugal enjoyed Gaspar da Gama and called him frequently to the court to hear his stories about the lands and customs of the East. There was a suspicion that Gaspar da Gama was an Arab spy, but the Portuguese recognized his value, because beside having traded in some of their centers in India, he spoke Latin, Arabic, Italian, Castilian, Portuguese and some languages of India. Because of this, King Manuel I appointed him counselor and interpreter of the second fleet sailing to the Indies, led by Pedro Álvares Cabral.

Always with a cap on his head and dressed in white linen, Gaspar da Gama was one of the more exotic characters in the fleet of Pedro Álvares Cabral. Although not the only linguist at the expedition that discovered the Brazil, he was the main interpreter in the trade negotiations between the Portuguese and Brazilian Indians, along with Gonçalo Madeira. Once in India, Gaspar da Gama fulfilled his mission with his interpreter services and knowledge of geopolitics and customs of India important in business meetings of Portuguese and Indian rajas in Calicut and Cochin.

He returned on his own will to Portugal with Pedro Álvares Cabral. In 1501, the fleet met the expedition of Gaspar de Lemos appointed by the king of Portugal to explore the newly discovered lands of Brazil, near modern Dakar, Senegal. Talks between Gaspar da Gama and other members of the expedition with the Florentine Amerigo Vespucci who accompanied Gaspar de Lemos certainly strengthened the idea that the lands discovered by Christopher Columbus were not the Indies, but a new continent.

In 1502 Gaspar da Gama participated in another travel to India commanded by Vasco da Gama, and again in 1505 with the recently appointed viceroy Francisco de Almeida. During these trips, he learned a few African languages.

He participated in the Indian expeditions of the Portuguese who tried to conquer Hormuz in 1508 and Calicut in 1510, when some assume that he died. Others believe that he returned to Portugal where he died. Some say that his death occurred between 1510 and 1515, or even by about 1520, with nearly eighty years. The change of Christian name "Terra de Santa Cruz" to "Brazil" is attributed by some to Gaspar da Gama and Fernão de Noronha, both being Jewish. However, this does not have an historical basis, being due to the intense trade in Brazilwood.
