= Hermida =

Hermida is a surname, and may refer to:

- Alfred Hermida (born 1965), British digital media scholar
- Alicia Hermida (1932–2022), Spanish actress and acting teacher
- Angel. G. Hermida (born 1941), Puerto Rican jurist
- Ángel Hermida (born 1967), Spanish handball player
- Borgie Hermida (born 1988), Filipino basketball coach and former player
- Emanuel Hermida (born 1987), Argentine footballer
- Hugo Campos Hermida (1928–2001), Uruguayan police officer
- Javier Hermida (born 1968), Spanish sailor
- Jeremy Hermida (born 1984), American baseball player
- Jesús Hermida (1937–2015), Spanish journalist and TV presenter
- Joaquín Hermida (born 1921), Mexican equestrian
- José Antonio Hermida (born 1978), Spanish cyclist
- Lorena Hermida (born 1988), Colombian model
- Paula Hermida (born 1977), Spanish tennis player
- Pepe Hermida (1897–1970), Spanish footballer
- Sandra Hermida Muñiz (born 1972), Spanish film producer
- Tania Hermida (born 1968), Ecuadorian film director and screenwriter

Hermida is the 3081 most common surname in Spain.

Hermida in Spain, by area
Province	Rank
Lugo	179 most common (354 people)
La Coruña	452 most common (526 people)
Madrid	3954 most common (520 people)

The surname Hermida is ranked 35,605 out of 88,799 in the United States.
