= João de Sá =

Portuguese explorer

- Born: Kingdom of Portugal
- Occupations: Explorer, Scrivener

João de Sá, knight (fl. 1497 – 1514) was a Portuguese explorer, who accompanied Vasco da Gama on the voyage of the first ships to sail directly from Europe to India.

== Biography ==
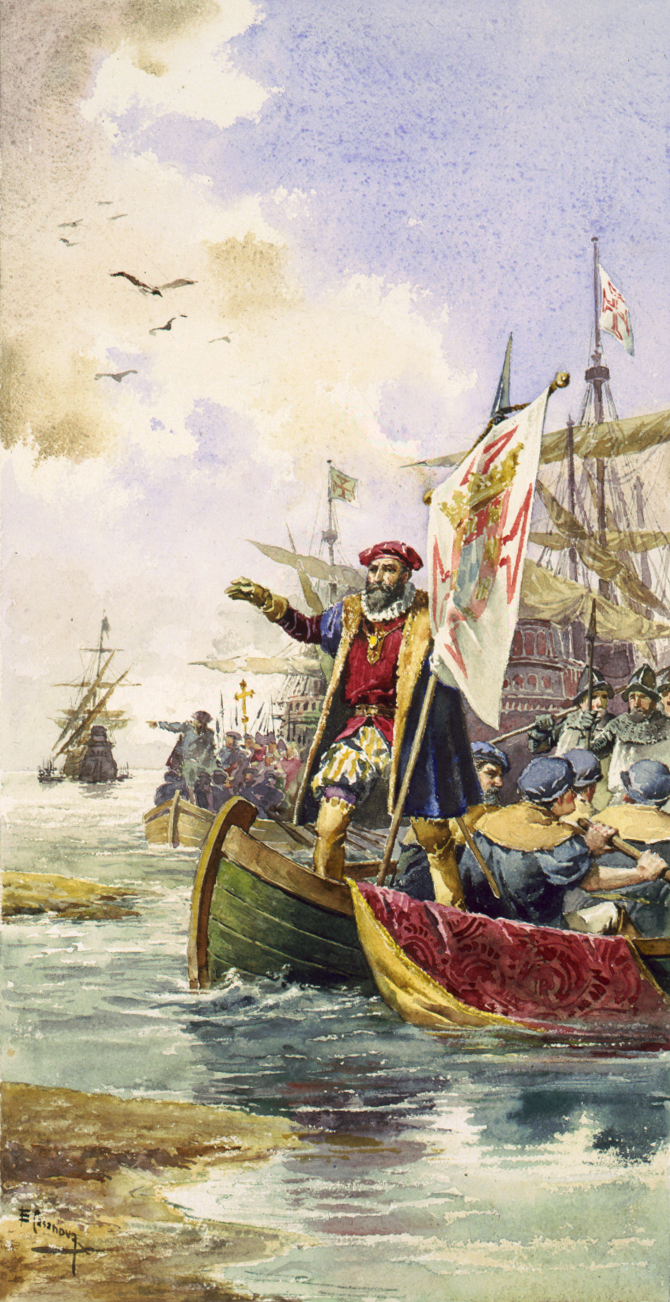
Vasco da Gama lands at Calicut, 20 May 1498.

Sá was a scrivener on the first Portuguese voyage to India, traveling on the carrack São Rafael which was captained by Vasco da Gama's older brother, Paulo da Gama. Sá was also a member of the group who accompanied Gama on his first trip into Calicut on 20 May 1498.

On the return voyage the São Rafael was scuttled off the East African coast, and the crew re-distributed to the remaining two ships, the São Gabriel and the Berrio, as by this point there were not enough crewmen left standing to manage all three ships. This was due to the loss of almost half the crew during the voyage across the Indian Ocean, and to scurvy being rife amongst the survivors. João de Sá transferred to the São Gabriel. Later on, after having sailed around Africa, Sá was given command of the ship because Vasco da Gama decided to remain at Santiago island with his brother Paulo, who had fallen seriously ill. The S. Gabriel under Sá arrived in Lisbon sometime in late July or early August. Although Paulo was later able to travel on with his brother towards Portugal, he died whilst en route and was buried at the monastery of São Francisco in Angra do Heroismo.

João de Sá is one of the purported authors of the anonymous Journal of Vasco Da Gama's trip of 1497 (the other being Álvaro Velho). This work survives in a single manuscript copy preserved at the Biblioteca Pública Municipal of Porto and first published in Porto in 1838 by Diogo Kopke. In 1945, historian Franz Hümmerich identified the author of this manuscript with an Álvaro Velho who had spent eight years in Guinea and provided information about the Gambia region to Valentim Fernandes. However, more recent studies by Carmen Radulet have exposed weaknesses in this theory and attributed the Journal with more certainty to scrivener João de Sá.

Like Vasco da Gama, João de Sá appears to have been closely associated with the Almeida family. It is believed that he spent some time at Safi (North Africa) after his return from India, possibly at the same time as being criado to the Bishop of Coimbra, D. Jorge de Almeida.

Between February 1511 and April 1514, de Sá, who was a trained scrivener, was the treasurer of spices in the Casa da Índia. He had also become a cavalier by royal letter in January 1512.

== See also ==
- Portuguese India Armadas
- Portuguese India
- Spice trade
