= Egisto Bracci =

Italian architect, active mainly in Florence

Egisto Bracci (1 January 1830 in Florence – August 1909) was an Italian architect, active mainly in Florence, who became resident professor of architecture at the Academy of Fine Arts of Florence in 1879.

He was a colleague of Dario Guidotti in early education; by age 16, he was apprenticed to the studio of the Sienese architect Giovan Battista Silvestri (1796-1873), and then with Enrico Presenti. He worked on projects to decorate the stations of the railroad route of Montevarchi-Arezzo and the mines of Tana. Afterward he worked with engineer Del Noce, who was transforming the Palazzo Paggeschi, the Hôtel della Pace in Piazza Manin (now Piazza Ognissanti). He also worked on the refurbishing of the inn, now Albergo Montebello.

He became a volunteer in the First Italian War of Independence, but had to withdraw when he became ill. He returned to Florence, where he worked until 1854 to care for those afflicted during a cholera epidemic. Working independently, he designed what is now the Palazzo Levi for the Baron of Vagnonville at Piazza Vittorio Veneto in Florence. He also designed the stables for the banchiere Du Fresne in the fondaci di Santo Spirito and the Palazzo of Ernesto Levi in Piazza Indipendenza, as well as other buildings for the Levi family. He designed the Palazzo Sariette in via Calzaioli. Later in life, he was knighted by the Kingdom of Italy.
