= Álvaro Velho =

Portuguese sailor or soldier

Álvaro Velho (15th-16th century, born in Barreiro, Portugal) was a Portuguese sailor or soldier who took part in the first Portuguese expedition by sea to India, led by Vasco da Gama in 1497.

Velho is one of the purported authors of the anonymous Journal of Vasci Da Gama's trip of 1497 (the other being João de Sá). This work survives in a single manuscript copy preserved at the Biblioteca Pública Municipal of Porto and first published in Porto in 1838 by Diogo Kopke.

In 1945, historian Franz Hümmerich identified the author of this manuscript with an Álvaro Velho who had spent eight years in Guinea and provided information about the Gambia region to Valentim Fernandes. However, more recent studies by Carmen Radulet have exposed weaknesses in this theory and attributed the Journal with more certainty to scrivener João de Sá.

In 2013, this document was inscribed by UNESCO on the Memory of the World heritage list. After this trip, Álvaro Velho will have spent eight years in Guinea (1499-1507). Currently, a school in Lavradio and a street in Barreiro are named after him.
