= Emanuel Hermida =

Argentine footballer

Personal information
- Full name: Emanuel Juan Cruz Hermida
- Date of birth: 17 July 1987 (age 39)
- Place of birth: Rosario, Argentina
- Position: Forward

Senior career*
Years	Team	Apps	(Gls)
2007	Platense Montevideo	8	(2)
2007	Juventud Las Piedras	3	(0)
2008	Unión de Álvarez	–	(–)
2008	San Luis	11	(0)
2009	Unión de Álvarez	–	(–)
2009–2010	Ferro General Alvear	–	(–)
2011	Guillermo Renny	–	(–)
2012–2014	Ferro General Pico	43	(9)
2014–2015	Atlético San Jorge	16	(0)
2015	Ferro General Pico	26	(8)
2016	Alvarado	14	(0)
2016	Kimberley MdP	–	(–)
2016–2020	Ferro General Pico	65	(6)
2021–2022	All Boys Trenel	–	(–)
2023	Independiente GP	–	(–)
2024	Pico FBC	–	(–)
2024–2025	Ferro General Pico	–	(–)
2025	Pico FBC	–	(–)
- * Club domestic league appearances and goals

Emanuel Juan Cruz Hermida (born in Argentina) is an Argentine former footballer who played as a forward.

== Teams ==
- Platense de Montevideo 2007
- Juventud de Las Piedras 2007
- Unión y Sociedad Italiana de Álvarez 2008
- San Luis de Quillota 2008
- Unión y Sociedad Italiana de Álvarez 2009
- Ferro Carril Oeste de General Alvear 2009–2010
- Guillermo Renny 2011
- Ferro Carril Oeste de General Pico 2012–2014
- Atlético San Jorge 2014–2015
- Ferro Carril Oeste de General Pico 2015
- Alvarado 2016
- Kimberley de Mar del Plata 2016
- Ferro Carril Oeste de General Pico 2016–2020
- All Boys de Trenel 2021–2022
- Independiente de General Pico 2023
- Pico FBC 2024
- Ferro Carril Oeste de General Pico 2024–2025
- Pico FBC 2025

== Personal life ==
As a child, Hermida faced Lionel Messi in his hometown, Rosario.
