= Bracci-Cambini =

Italian family

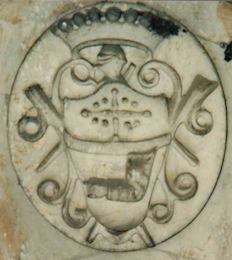
Bracci-Cambini Coat of Arms.

The Bracci-Cambini family represents many centuries of Italian history (IX° Sec.). The archives of the family have provided historians and professors with an example of the heredity rules in the high nobility in the 18th and 19th centuries. Therefore, several academic books and articles have been written about the family, including In famiglia: Storie di interessi e affetti nell’Italia moderna by Roberto Bizzocchi and Il Casino dei Nobili: Famiglie illustri, viaggiatori, mondanità a Pisa tra Sette e Ottecent by Alessandro Panajia with Giovanni Benvenuti. The family coat of arms can still be seen in the Florentine Basilica of Santa Maria Novella near the altar of Saint Antonino. The Bracci Cambini family still live in Tuscany and Lazio.

One member of the family was Atanasio Bracci-Cambini dei marchesi Pigliu, who joined the troops of Garibaldi in the 1860 war against the King while he was a student at the University of Pisa. The response of the family was not supportive. Sister Zoe, a nun by the name of Maddelena Luisa, wrote: "This blow has hit me hard; I knew that the poor devil was a hothead, but I never imagined he would go this far". Even a Cardinal, on January 4, 1861, wrote: "It will not be the last tidying up of the corrupt, the madman coming to his senses" (translated from Bizzocchi).

An earlier member of the family was Leonardo. His epitaph (1742) read:

To Leonardo Bracci Cambini, citizen of Florence and Pisa, who after having travelled in many countries by land and by sea, finally returned home, subsequently showered with various offices in Pisa, he was finally put in charge of the Naval Consulate. He was shown to be zealous in the study of the Sacred Witness, of languages, of hydrogeography, in other disciplines, as well as justice and devoutness. He was distinguished for every day refreshing the poor; he was assiduous in self-denial and unconcern for himself; prompt in promoting public and private usefulness, charitable to enemies, constant finally in bearing up under every evil. Faithful and wise, he completed his last day in the year of salvation 1742, the ninth day of the Calends of February, at eighty years of age. Giovanni Battista, Ranieri Maria e Antonio Maria sons full of sorrow lay him down here, where with Bona Caterina Ruschi loving spouse they await the day of renewed redemption (translated from Bizzocchi, p. 62).

== Sources ==
- Roberto Bizzocchi, In famiglia: Storie di interessi e affetti nell’Italia moderna, Roma-Bari, Laterza, 2001 (in Italian)
- English translation of In famiglia: Storie di interessi e affetti nell’Italia moderna,
- Book review of Roberto Bizzocchi, In famiglia. Storie di interessi e affetti nell'Italia moderna, Roma-Bari, Laterza, 2001, (in French)
- Archives at the University of Pisa:
- State Archives at Pisa:
