= Anjediva Island =

Island off the coast of Goa, India

Anjediva Ilha de Angediva
- Island
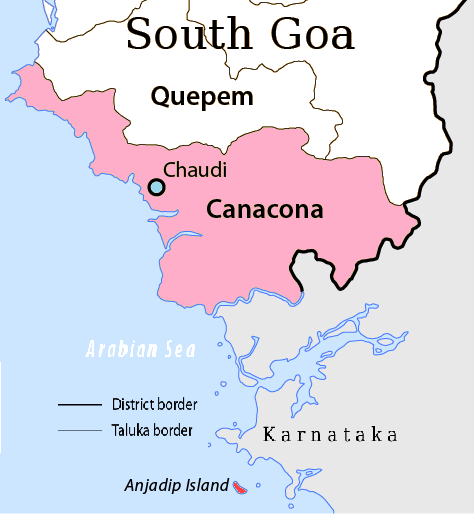
- Location of Anjediva (red) in Canacona (pink)

- Location within India
- Coordinates: 14.760886°N 74.111258°E
- Country: India
- State: Goa
- District: South Goa
- Township: Canacona
- Portuguese Establishment: before 1498

Government
  - Type: Indian Navy

Area
  - Total: 1.5 km^{2} (0.58 sq mi)
- Elevation: 8 m (26 ft)

Population (2011)
  - Total: 0
  - Density: 0.0/km^{2} (0.0/sq mi)
- Time zone: UTC+5:30 (IST)

Anjediva
Native name: Ilha de Angediva
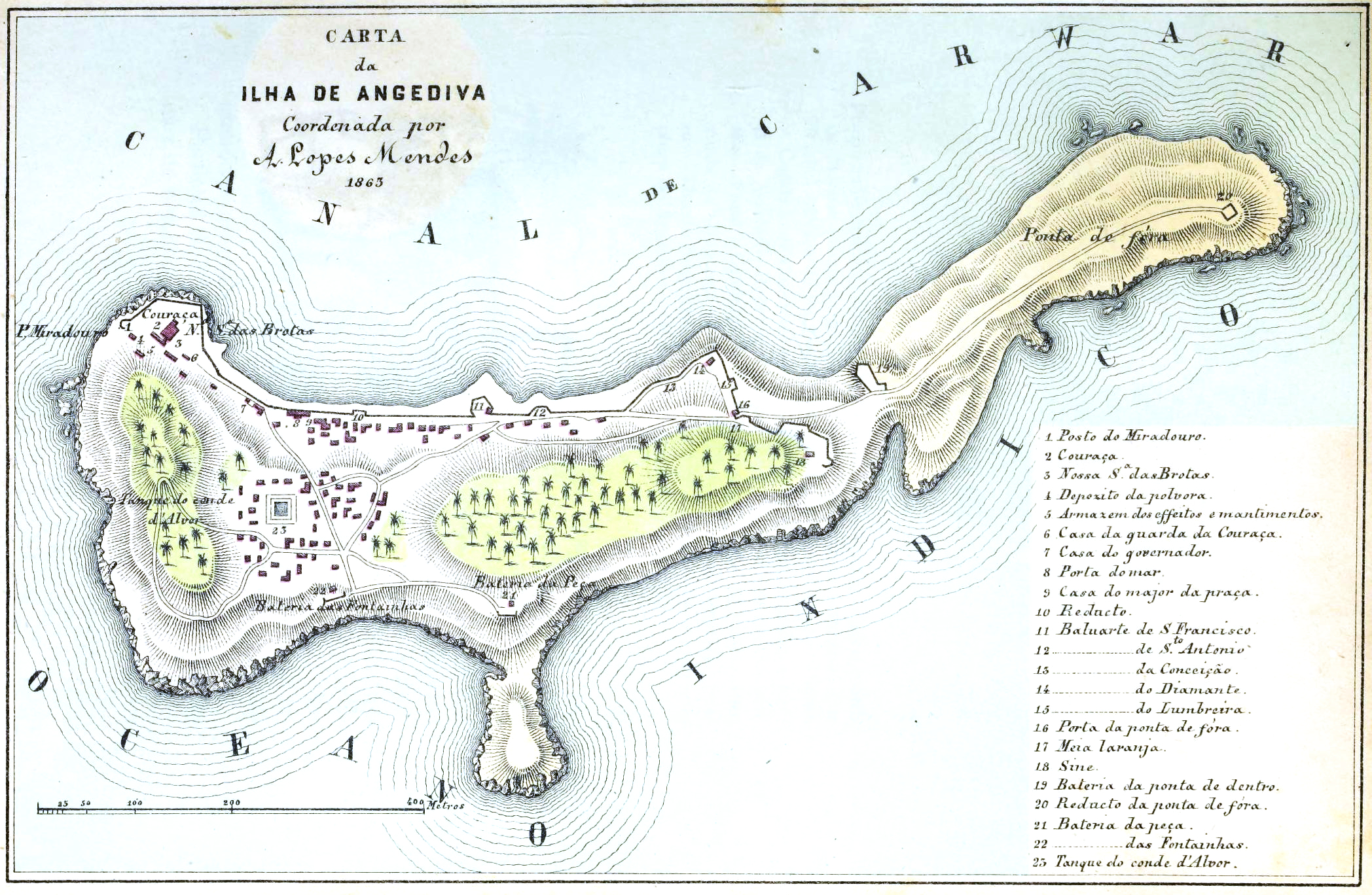
- A map of Anjediva in 1885
- Interactive map of Anjediva

Geography
- Location: Arabian Sea
- Area: 1.5 km^{2} (0.58 sq mi)
- Length: 1.5 km (0.93 mi)
- Width: 0.25 km (0.155 mi)
- Coastline: 0.070 km (0.0435 mi)
- Highest elevation: 8 m (26 ft)

Administration
- India
- State: Goa
- District: South Goa
- Sub District: Canacona

Demographics
- Population: 0 (2011)
- Pop. density: 0/km^{2} (0/sq mi)
- Ethnic groups: Goan Catholics (now resettled)

Anjediva Island (also Anjadip Island) (Goan Konkani: Anjadiv; Portuguese: Ilha de Angediva) is an island in the Arabian Sea. It sits off the coast of Karwar, Karnataka. It is politically part of Goa state, geographically the nearest mainland is the Kanara subregion of Karnataka.

The island is about 1.8 kilometres (1 mile) south of Goa, and extends over 1.5 square kilometres (1 square mile). It was part of the Portuguese Indian settlements until 1961. Following the annexation of Goa and Damaon the place was turned into a military base, after which the civilian population was resettled on the Indian mainland or returned to Portugal.

The island is home to the Portuguese-built Anjediva fortress, which houses the shrines of Our Lady of Brotas and São Francisco de Assis. The island is connected to the mainland by a breakwater. Anjediva is part of the INS Kadamba base of the Indian Navy, near the city of Karwar.

== Geography ==
The island lies approximately 1.8 km from the district of Uttar Kannada. It is 4 km south of Karwar (once Baticala, or the kingdom of Garsopa, in Portuguese times) and about 87 km south of what once was called the city of Goa. Covering only 1.5 square kilometers, the island is 1.3 km long and 300 meters wide, on average.

The only regular presence is members of the Indian Navy. Occasionally, other visitors and fishermen come across the island. In the nineteenth century, some 200 people had permanent settlements there.

== History ==
=== Origin ===
The Anjidiv Island or the Anjediva is the largest island in an archipelago of five islands just off the Karwar coast, the other four being Kurmagad, Madlingad, Devgad and Devragad. There are two theories about how it got its name. The first is that ‘Anjediva’ is derived from ‘Anji’ (five) and ‘div’ (island), while the other is that its name is derived from the temple of ‘Anjadurga’ which once stood there, worshipped since ancient times. being a halt for ancient Roman traders at the turn of the 1st millennium CE, the Romans called the island "Aigidioum" (land of Agi Goddess). The earliest reference to the island can be found in the ancient Roman trade manual Peripulus Of The Erythraean Sea by Geographer Ptolemy (150 CE), which speaks of the Island of ‘Aegidii’ just off the western coast of India. The text mentions how the island served as a halt for Roman traders who sailed with the monsoon winds between the Red Sea and the Malabar coast. Between the 5th and 7th CE, the island was ruled by the Kadambas of Goa. Archaeological excavations have revealed pillars of a temple, probably dedicated to Goddess Anjadurga or Aryadurga. It is believed that some time in the 9th CE, the deity was moved to Ankola village in Karnataka, probably due to political turmoil. During this time, the island was used by Arab traders as a harbour during monsoon and to repair their ships.

Vasco da Gama claimed the island as Portuguese crown territory on September 24, 1498 during his first trip to India.

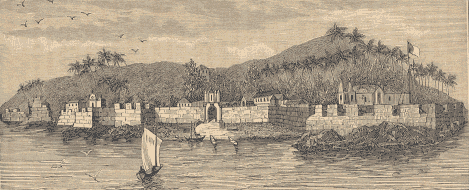
Fort Anjediva

The Portuguese presence on the island began with the landing of D. Francisco de Almeida on September 13, 1505, who ordered the building of a fortress, which was destroyed seven months later. The Afonso de Albuquerque attack, which culminated in the conquest of Goa in 1510, was launched from Anjediva. The island was unoccupied until 1661 when the English settled there, waiting for the treaty of July 23 to be complied. This treaty eventually yielded them Bombay, which was transferred among the colonial powers in 1665.

=== English presence ===
The English presence came when Viceroy Antonio de Melo e Castro refused to hand Bombay to the British following the marriage of Charles II to Catherine of Braganza, in which the city formed part of her dowry. Ships transported the English troops, commanded by the Earl of Marlborough and accompanied by future Governor-general Sir Abraham Shipman, sought shelter from the monsoons. Shipman, along with many officers and soldiers, eventually died due to the climate and poor housing, so harsh that of the initial force of over 500 men who arrived in 1662, only 191 men survived to leave the island.

With the departure of the British in 1665, the island was vacant until the Marathas raids (led by Sambhaji in 1682) forced the Portuguese to rebuild the fort. The work was ordered by viceroy Francisco de Távora, Count of Alvor, as recorded by a plaque placed on the fortress.

In addition to the Anjediva Fort, the island was defended by other forts. Military barracks were constructed. A church dedicated to Our Lady of Brotas was built, along with a chapel dedicated to Our Lady of Sorrows (Nossa Senhora das Dores) and St. Francis of Assisi. A large tank for drinking water supplied water to the barracks and ships.

The present church of Our Lady of Brotas was built in 1729 at the site where Pedro Alvares Cabral landed on August 22, 1500. He was then in command of the second Portuguese expedition of India and attended a Thanksgiving Mass celebrated by Friar Henrique de Coimbra, in the presence of eight Franciscan friars. It was the first mass celebrated by the Portuguese in India.

=== Refuge ===
During the Portuguese occupation in the 18th century, the island sheltered Christians and Hindus of the mainland coastal border. The invasion of the realms of Bednore and Soonda by the Muslim forces of Tipu Sultan created the new potentate of Khodadad by seizing the throne of the Maharajas of Mysore. The island then reached its highest development, and in 1768 it had a governor with staff and 350 soldiers.

In 1856, the island was hit by a major epidemic, attributed to a cemetery near the source of water that supplied the population. Once the cemetery was transferred to the island's north side, living conditions improved significantly. The population that had meanwhile settled in Boca de Vaca in Panjim no longer wanted to return.

In 1954 relations between Portugal and India had started to deteriorate. Retired military personnel then settled on Anjediva. Following allegations of incursions by Indian forces, the Portuguese placed a military detachment on the island. Links with Goa were maintained, but in the monsoon season, the island was isolated.

In 1960, at the initiative of governor-general General Vassallo e Silva, the Church of Our Lady of Brotas and the Chapel of St. Francis of Assisi were restored along with the island's barracks.

== Portuguese-Indian relations ==
Coat of arms of Portuguese India (1935–1951)

On November 24, 1961, just before the invasion of Portuguese India by the Republic of India, Anjediva was the scene of an incident when an Indian passenger ship, the Sabarmati, was fired upon by the Portuguese military garrison, injuring a crew member and killing a passenger. The Portuguese government had argued that the naval area on the island had been invaded. Although this was already in preparation, the incident contributed to the outbreak of Operation Vijay, which culminated at the end of Portuguese rule in Goa and its incorporation into the Indian Union.

Recognizing the strategic importance of Anjediva, the island was occupied on December 22, 1961. Lieutenant Arun Auditto led a landing party which assaulted and captured the island in a military action that cost the lives of seven Indian soldiers, remembered in a monument there. This reduced the civilian population to four persons: two elderly women, a man and a child along with 30 Goan and Portuguese soldiers. After 1961, the population of about 200 fishermen who frequented Anjediva migrated to the mainland. The island remained abandoned until 1982, when, at the initiative of a local priest, the church was restored and pilgrimages resumed.

== Indian rule ==
Martyr's Memorial

Following an agreement in 1987 between the Goa government and the Indian Navy, the island became part of the Naval Base of Karwar in 1991. It is known as INS Kadamba or "Seabird". The base is projected to become one of the largest naval bases in Asia. This action, taken by Ravi S. Naik, who was, at the time, the chief minister of Goa, was strongly challenged, as the island was considered part of Goa's historical heritage. Construction of the base included the installation of a 1,800 meter-long breakwater connecting the northeast tip of the island to the tip of Binaga on the mainland, which allowed for road access.

The island celebrate the annual feast of Our Lady of Brotas, held on February 2, and the Feast of the Hermitage St. Francis of Assisi, held on 4 October.

In 2016, the Indian Parliament announced that Project Seabird at Karwar was a sensitive project, wherein people could not be allowed to access it freely. This created a local problem: it became impossible to gain permission to celebrate feasts at Anjediva Island in Goa.

== Geography ==
The island is located west of Karwar, Karnataka and is surrounded by the Arabian Sea.

== Culture ==
The island is known for its annual feast of Our Lady of Springs (Nossa Senhora das Brotas) on 2 February and Feast of the Chapel of St. Francis D'Assisi on 4 October.

Nossa Senhora das Brotas with altar

Ruins of Igreja de São Francisco de Assis

== See also ==
- Fort Anjediva
- Church of Our Lady of Springs
