= Gonçalo Coelho =

Portuguese explorer

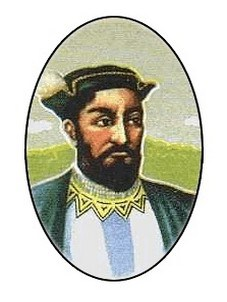
- Born: 1451 or 1454
- Died: 1512
- Occupation: Navigator

Gonçalo Coelho (fl. 1501–04) was a Portuguese explorer who belonged to a prominent family in northern Portugal. He commanded two expeditions (1501–02 and 1503–04) which explored much of the coast of Brazil.

== Biography ==
In 1501 Coelho was sent on an expedition to follow up on Pedro Álvares Cabral's discovery of Brazil. On 10 May, he sailed from Lisbon as "Captain General" of three caravels. Among his crew was a Florentine resident in Seville, Amerigo Vespucci. On 17 August, his expedition made landfall off the Brazilian coast at about 5° S. The fleet continued south, reaching Guanabara Bay (23° S) on New Year's Day 1502, naming it "Rio de Janeiro". They sailed two degrees further south (reaching modern Cananéia), before leaving Brazil on 13 February 1502. If Amerigo Vespucci's account is to be believed, the expedition reached the latitude "South Pole elevation 52° [S]", in the cold latitudes of present-day Patagonia, reaching inhospitable seas and shores (or islands), before turning back, but this is still a matter of controversy. Only one of the three caravels returned to Lisbon, arriving there on 7 September 1502. Brazilian historian Varnhagen believed that in April 1502 the expedition might have discovered the South Georgia Island, finding evidence of this in a report by Vespucci.

Coelho again sailed from Lisbon on 10 May 1503, this time with a fleet of six sail. Vespucci once more accompanied him, now as captain of one of the ships. After stopping at Bezeguiche island near Cape Verde peninsula, the ships came to "an island in the midst of the sea" (probably Fernando de Noronha), where the flagship struck a reef and wrecked on 10 August. All the men were saved, being loaded into Vespucci's ship. They found a harbour, where they rendezvoused with one of the fleet. They then sailed to Brazil, arriving there in November at a bay they named "Todos os Santos" (today Baía de Todos os Santos). After waiting here in vain for the rest of the fleet, they sailed south to another bay, where they stayed for five months, building a fort and loading logwood. They left twenty-four men at the fort to load more logwood, and sailed for Lisbon, which they reached on 28 June 1504.
