= Ataenius noronhai =

Scientific classification
- Kingdom: Animalia
- Phylum: Arthropoda
- Clade: Pancrustacea
- Class: Insecta
- Order: Coleoptera
- Suborder: Polyphaga
- Infraorder: Scarabaeiformia
- Family: Scarabaeidae
- Genus: Ataenius
- Species: A. noronhai

Binomial name
- Ataenius noronhai Stebnicka, 2007

Species of beetle

Ataenius noronhai is a species of beetle of the family Scarabaeidae. It is found in Brazil (Pernambuco), and is likely restricted to Fernando de Noronha.

== Description ==
Adults reach a length of about 3.8–4.2 mm (0.15–0.17 in). They have an oblong oval, moderately shining, partially setaceous body. They are dark brown, with the elytra usually lighter than the fore body. The legs are reddish.
