= Forte de Nossa Senhora dos Remédios =

- Fernando de Noronha, Pernambuco in Brazil
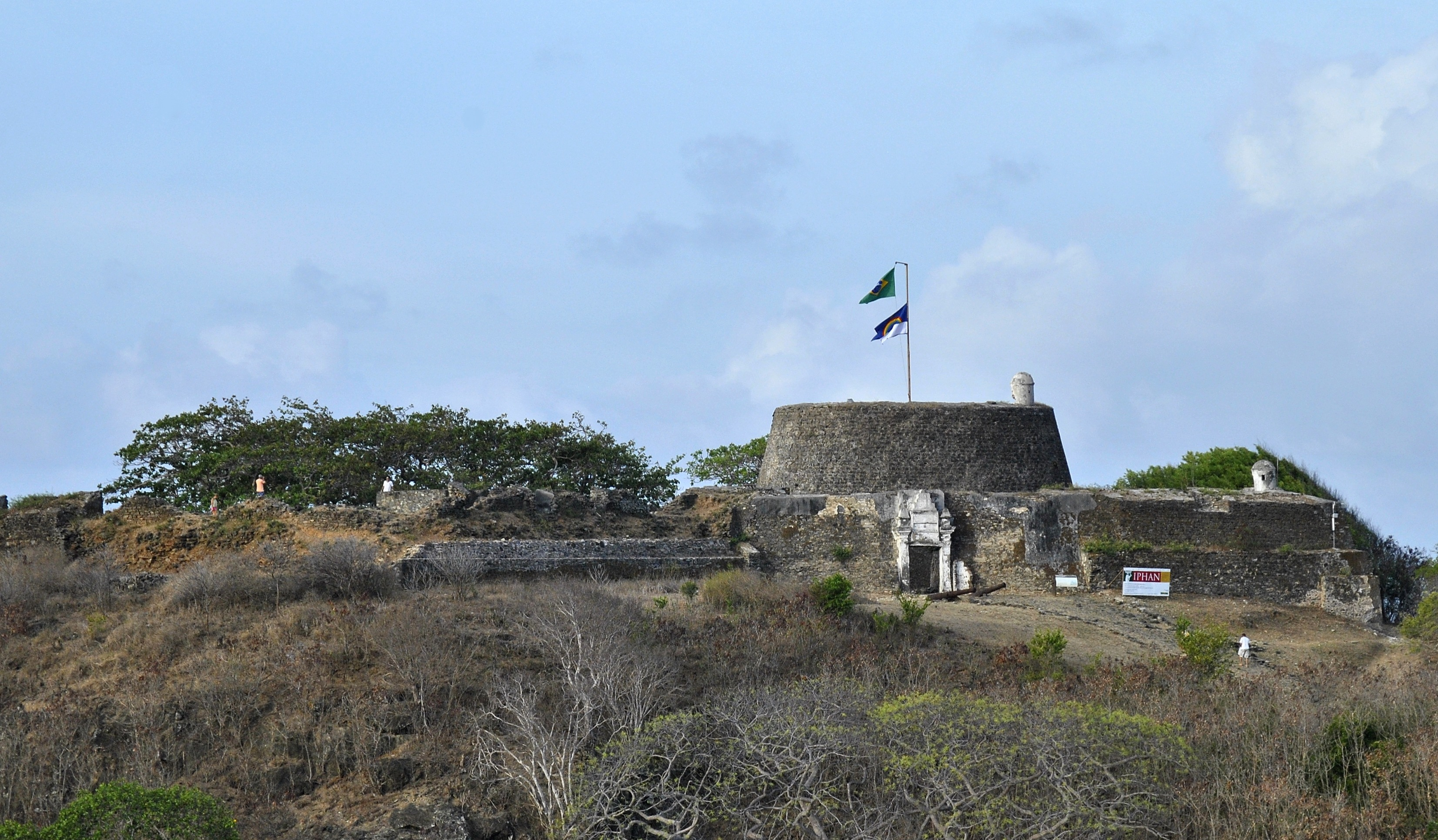
- View of Fortaleza de Nossa Senhora dos Remédios

Site information
- Type: Fort
- Open to the public: Yes

Location
- Location of Fortaleza de Nossa Senhora dos Remédios in Brazil
- Coordinates: 3.838333°S 32.410278°W

Forte de Nossa Senhora dos Remédios ('Fort of Our Lady of Remedies') is a fort located on the island of Fernando de Noronha (in the archipelago and municipality of the same name) in the state of Pernambuco in Brazil.

== See also ==
- Military history of Brazil
