= Fernando de Noronha =

- State district
- State District of Fernando de Noronha
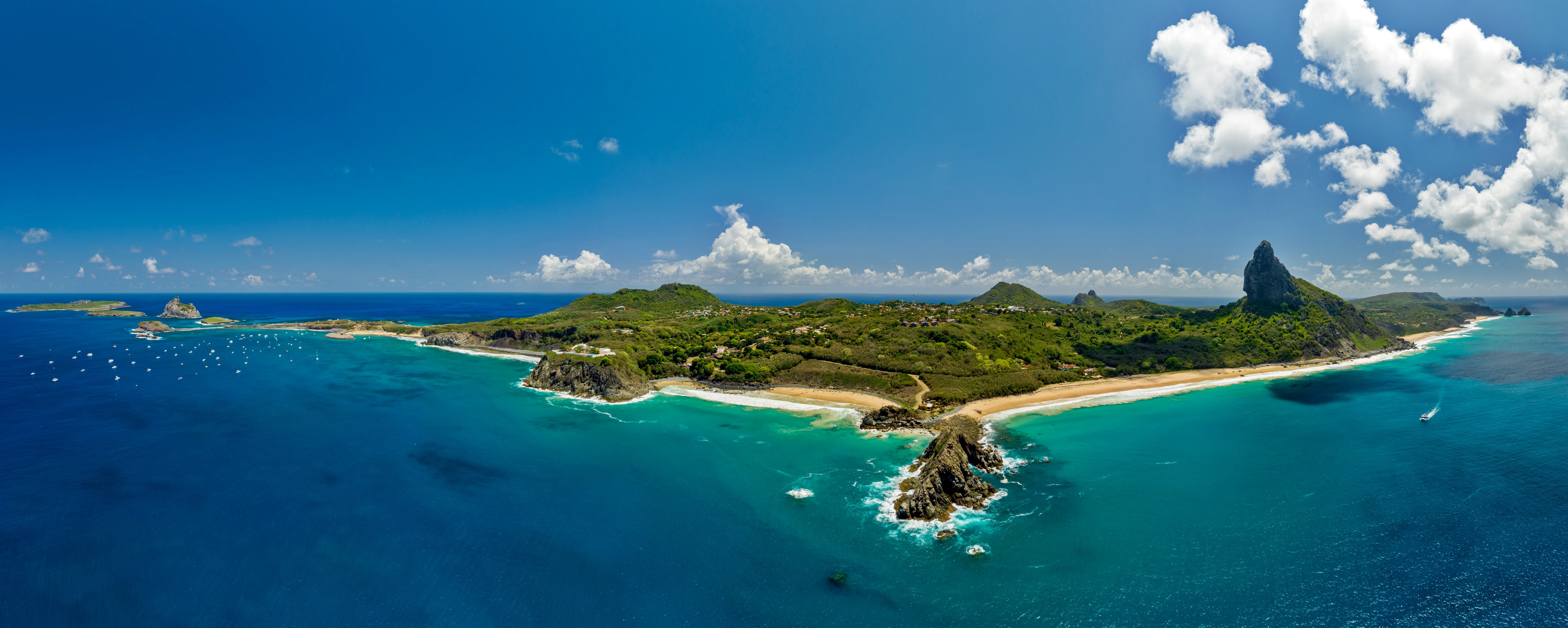
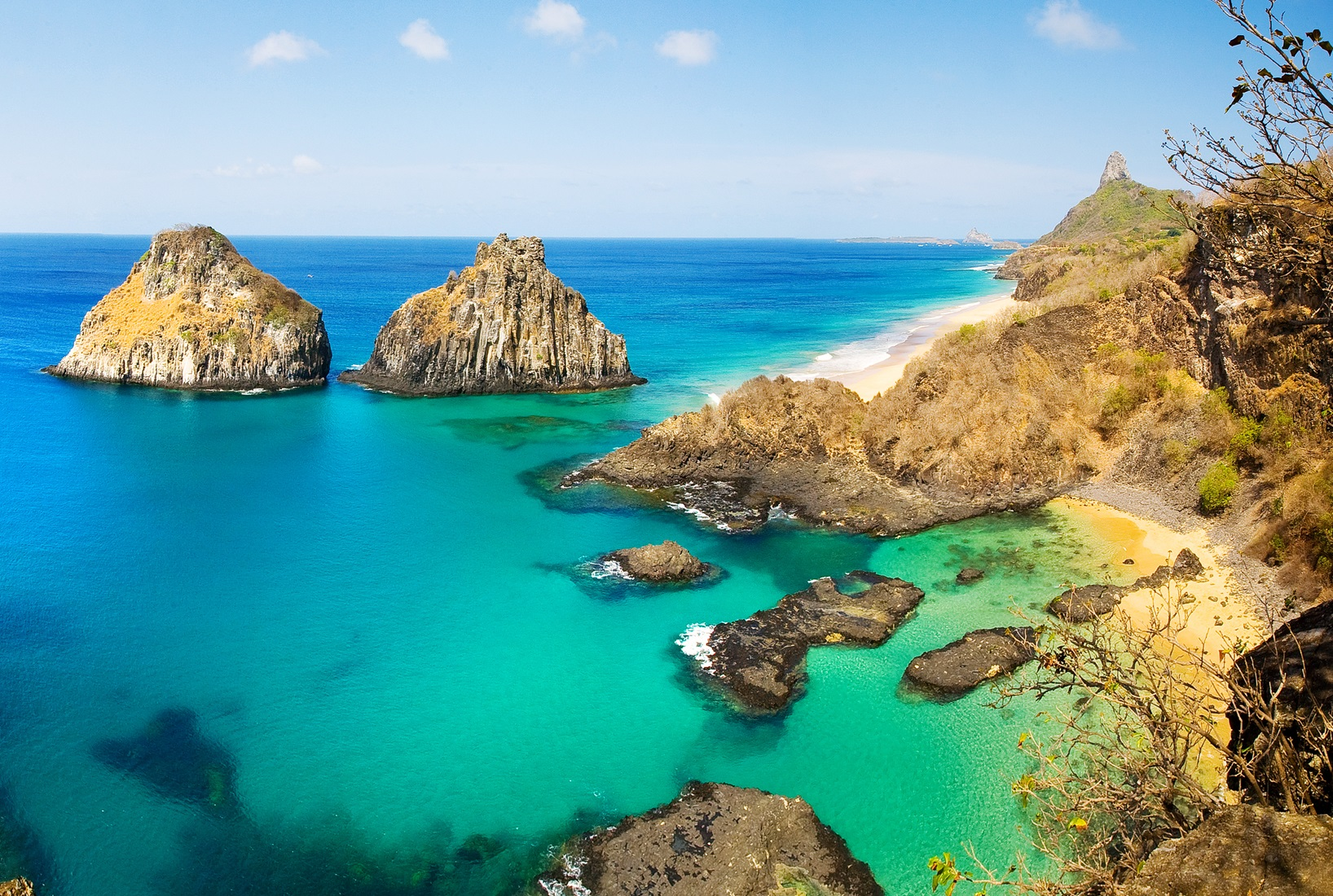
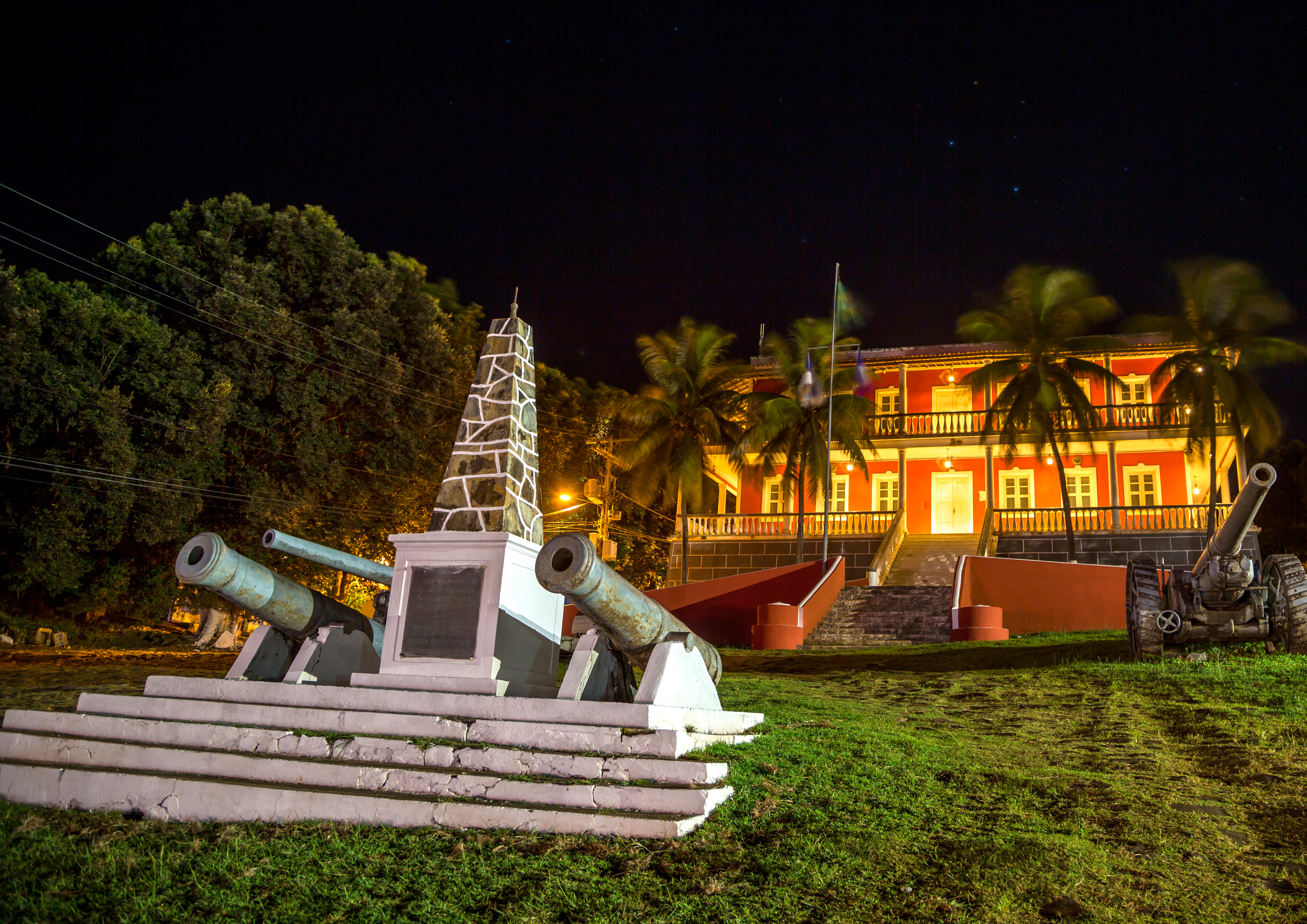
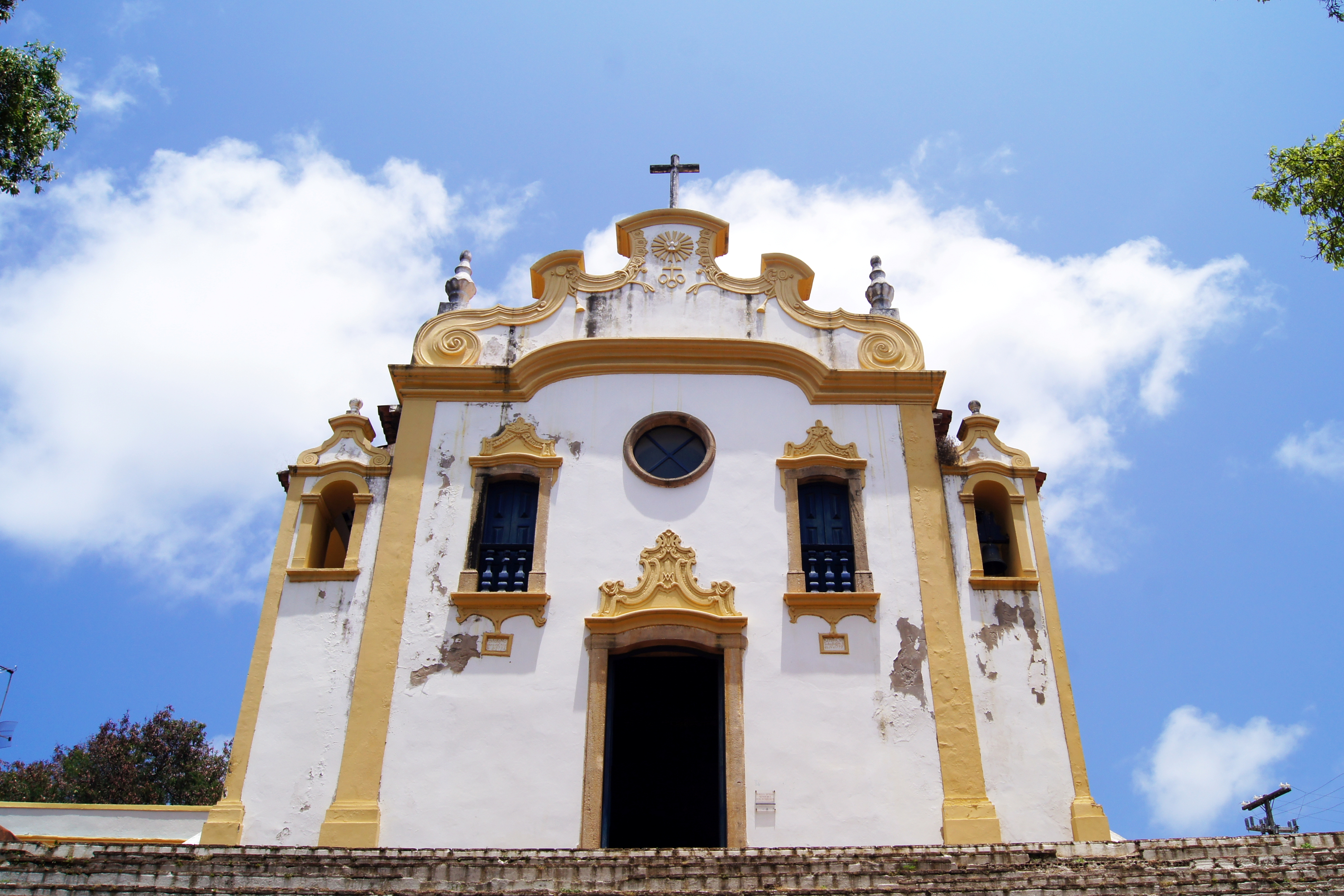
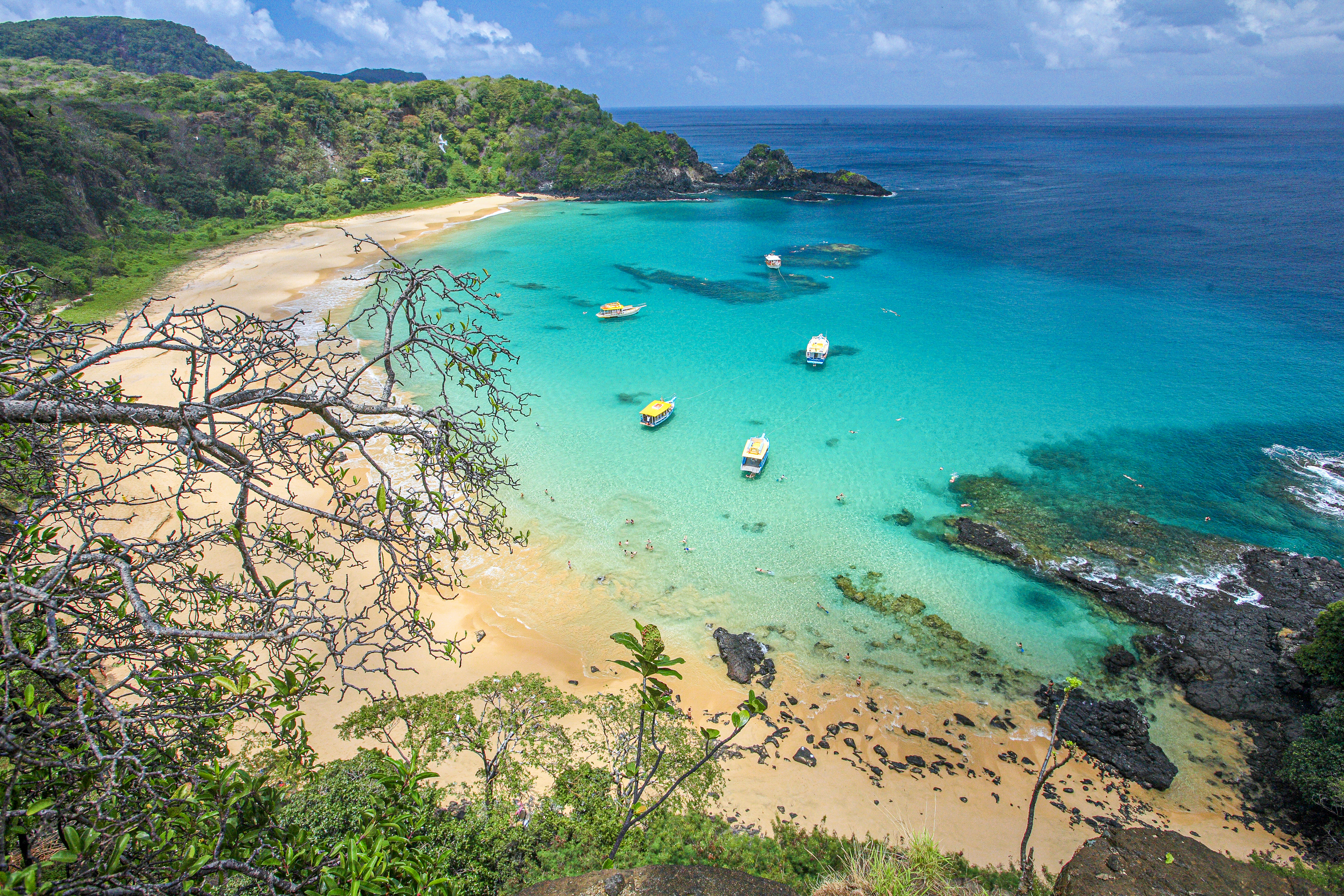
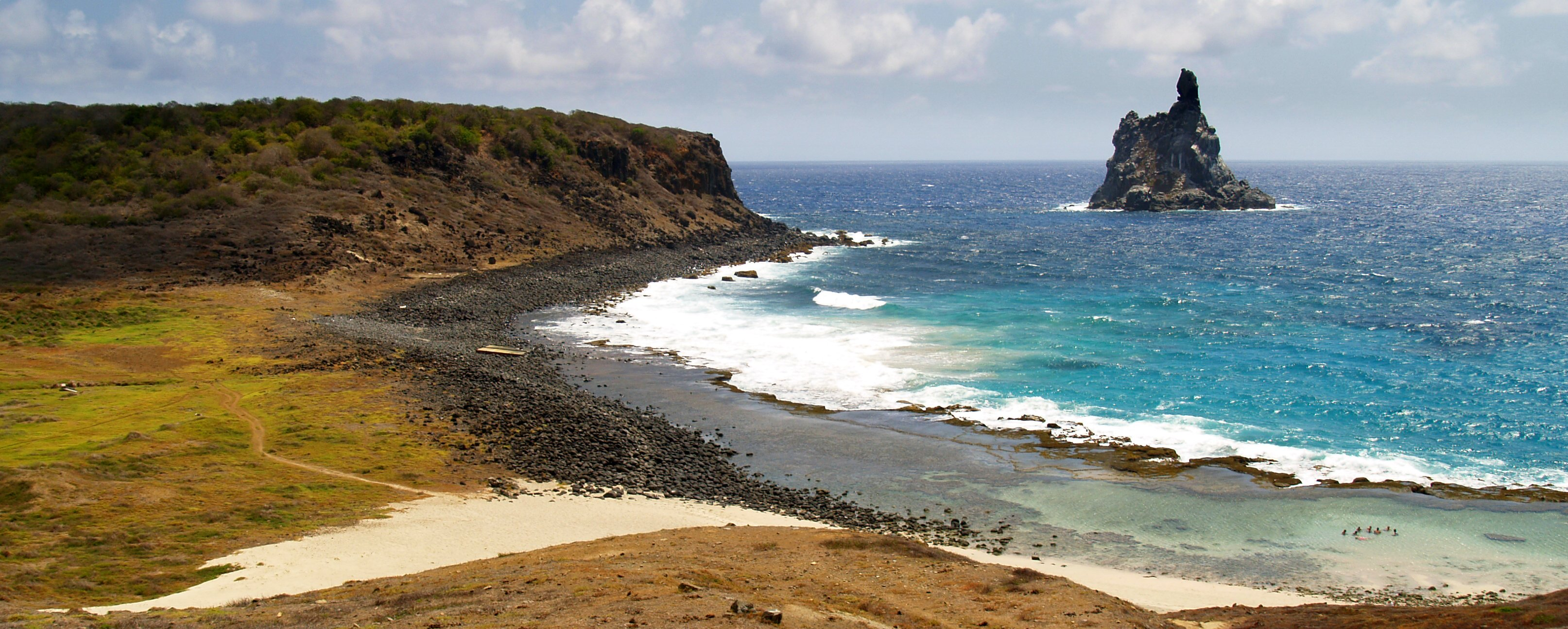
- Panoramic view of the archipelago, featuring the Nossa Senhora dos Remédios Fort (left), the Vila dos Remédios (center), and Morro do Pico (right) Baía dos Porcos and Morro Dois Irmãos São Miguel Palace Church of Our Lady of Remedies Sancho Bay Atalaia beach

- Flag Coat of arms

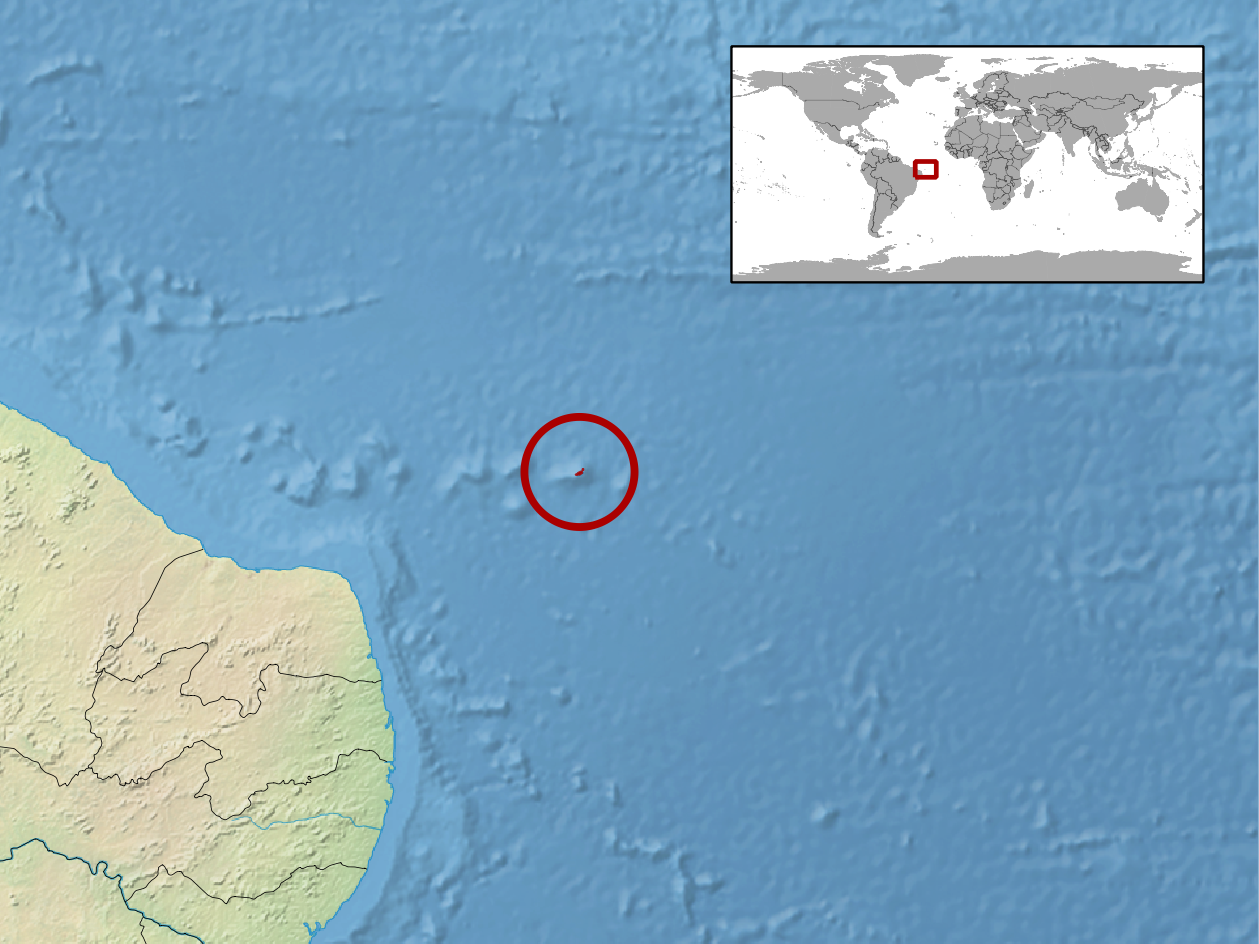

- Location in Brazil
- Coordinates: 03°51′18″S 32°25′30″W
- Country: Brazil
- State: Pernambuco
- Founded: August 10, 1503
- Founder: Amerigo Vespucci
- Named for: Fernão de Loronha

Government
  - President of the Federative Republic of Brazil: Luiz Inácio Lula da Silva
  - Governor: Raquel Lyra
  - General Administrator: Thallyta Figueirôa

Area
  - Total: 18 km^{2} (6.9 sq mi)

Population (2022 Census)
  - Total: 3,167
  - Estimate (2025): 3,341
  - Density: 180/km^{2} (460/sq mi)
- Demonym: Portuguese: Noronhense
- Time zone: UTC−02:00 (FNT)
- Postal code: 53990-000 to 53999-999
- Area code: +55 81
- ISO 3166 code: BR-PE
- Website: www.noronha.pe.gov.br fernandodenoronha.org

UNESCO World Heritage Site
- Official name: Brazilian Atlantic Islands: Fernando de Noronha and Atol das Rocas Reserves
- Type: Natural
- Criteria: vii, ix, x
- Designated: 2001 (25th session)
- Reference no.: 1000
- Region: Latin America and the Caribbean

Fernando de Noronha (Brazilian Portuguese pronunciation: [feʁˈnɐ̃du dʒi noˈɾoɲɐ]), officially the State District of Fernando de Noronha (Portuguese: Distrito Estadual de Fernando de Noronha) and formerly known as the Federal Territory of Fernando de Noronha (Território Federal de Fernando de Noronha) until 1988, is an archipelago in the Atlantic Ocean, part of the state of Pernambuco, Brazil, and located 191 nautical miles (354 km; 220 mi) off the Brazilian coast.

Fernando de Noronha consists of 21 islands and islets, extending over an area of 26 square kilometres (10 sq mi). Only the eponymous main island is inhabited; it has an area of 18.4 square kilometres (7.1 sq mi) and a population estimated at 3,101 in 2020. While most of the archipelago is relatively low-lying, there are parts reaching more than 100 meters (330 ft) in elevation, with the volcanic rock Morro do Pico standing 323 meters (about 1,060 feet) above sea level as its highest point.

The islands are administratively unique in Brazil. They form a "state district" (distrito estadual) that is administered directly by the government of the state of Pernambuco (despite being geographically closer to the state of Rio Grande do Norte). The state district's jurisdiction also includes the very remote Saint Peter and Saint Paul Archipelago, located 337 nautical miles (624 km; 388 mi) northeast of Fernando de Noronha.

In 1988, 70% of the area of Fernando de Noronha was established as a national marine park. In 2001, UNESCO designated the islands as a World Heritage Site because of their importance as a feeding ground for tuna, sharks, sea turtles, and marine mammals. Its time zone is UTC−02:00 all year round.

== History ==
=== Discovery ===
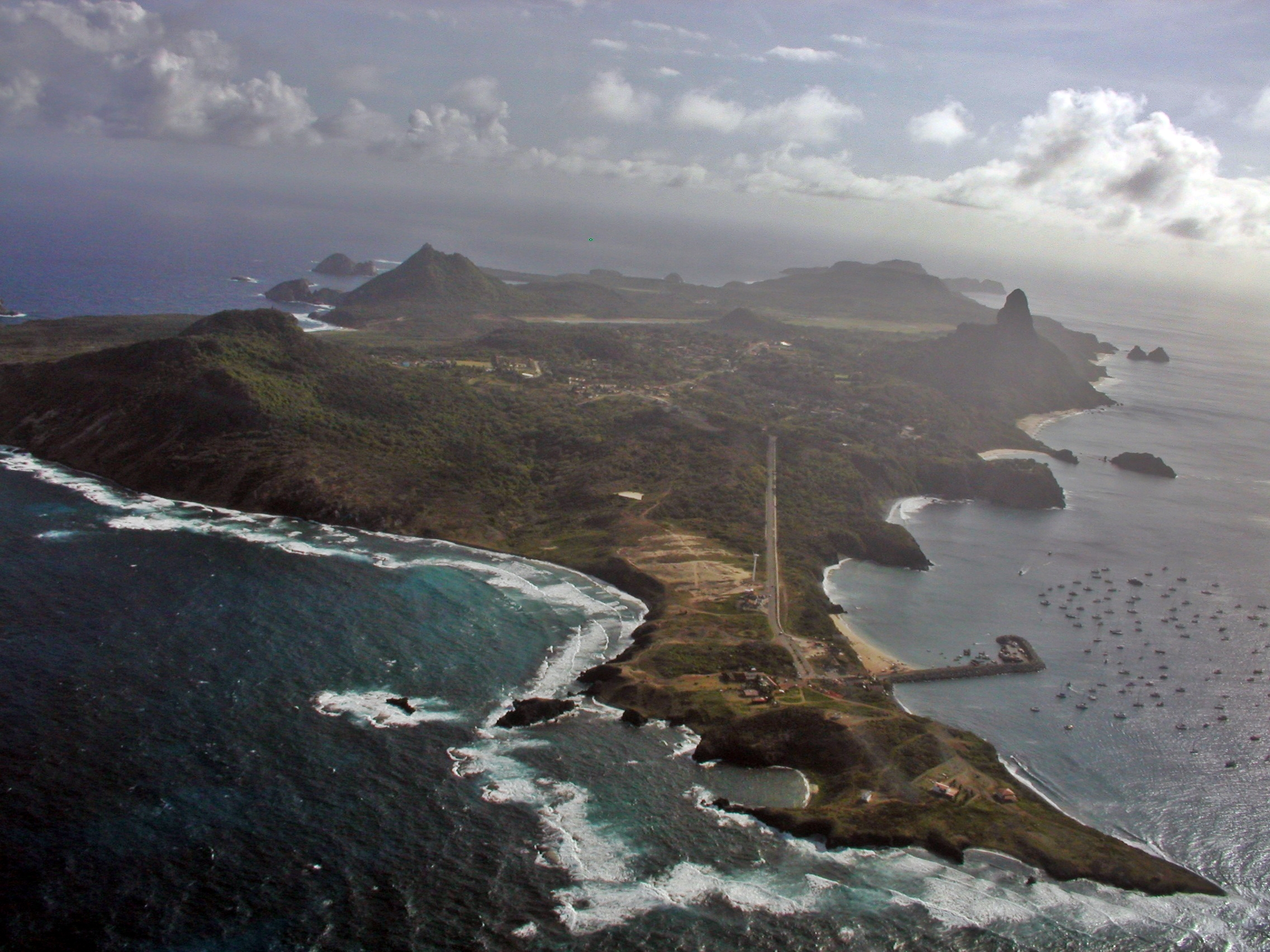
The main island

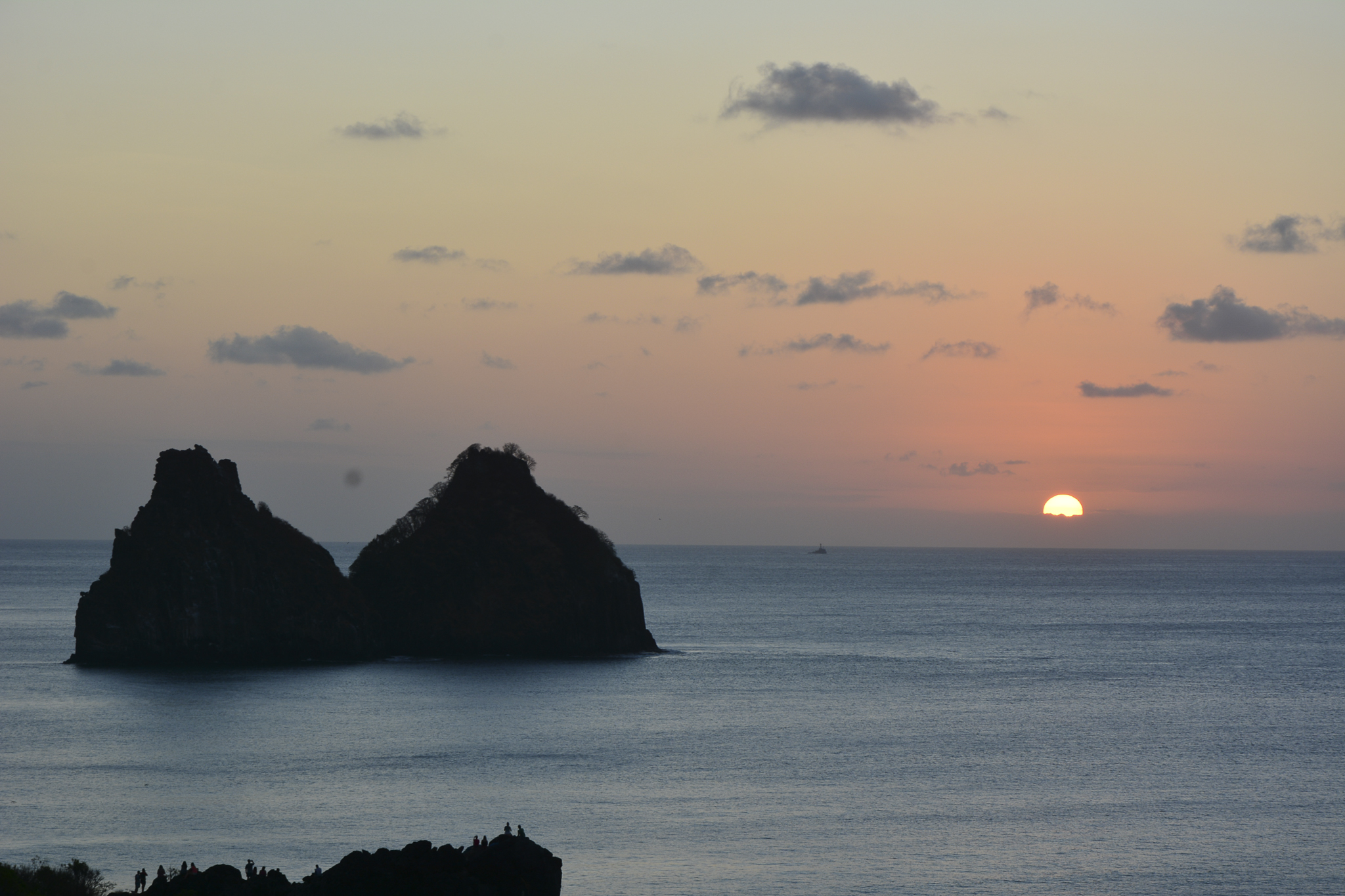
Morro Dois Irmãos

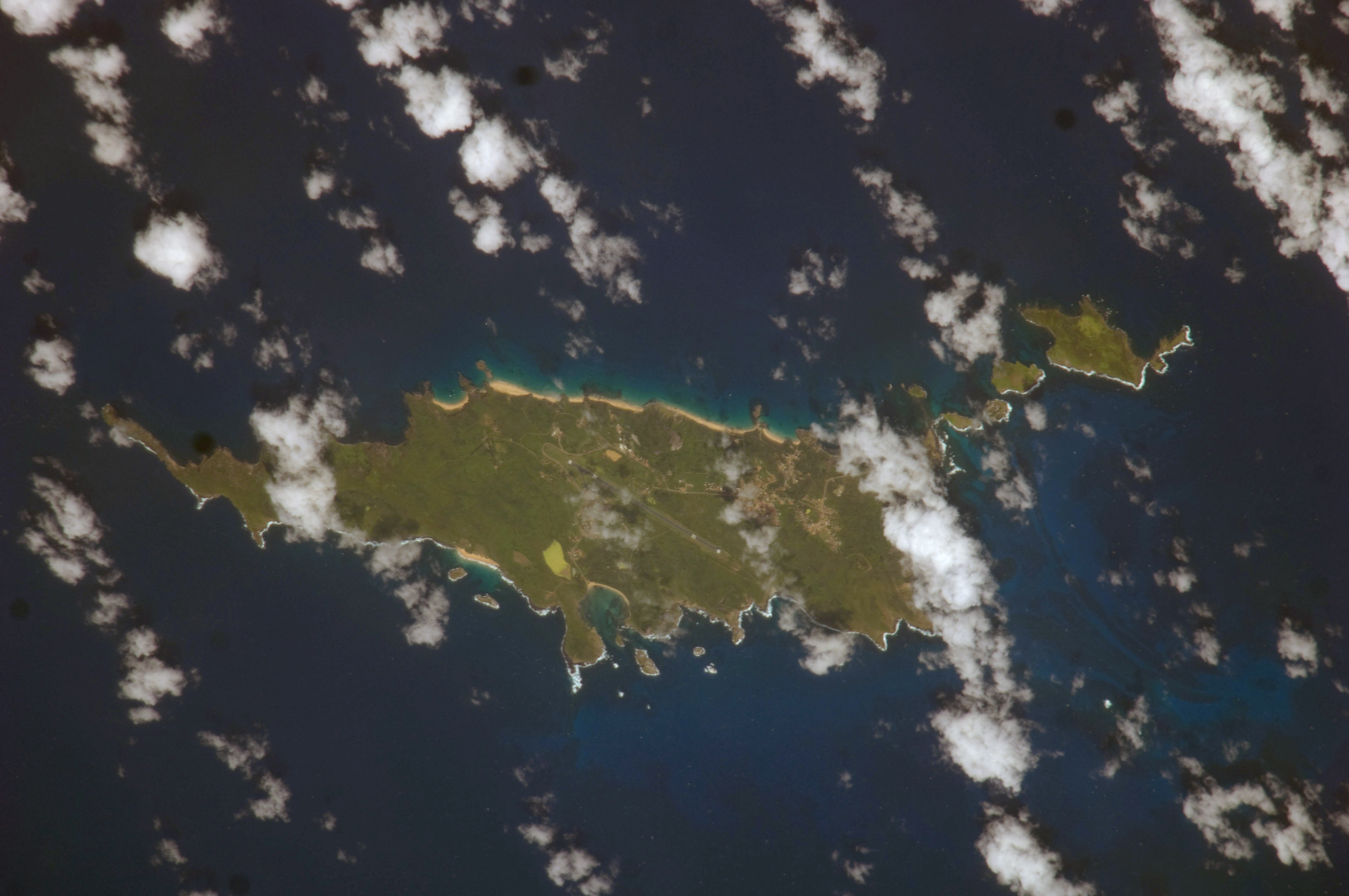
Satellite picture of Fernando de Noronha

Fernando de Noronha's occupation dates to the early 16th century. Due to its geographical position, the archipelago was one of the first lands sighted in the New World, being shown in a nautical chart in 1500 by the Spanish cartographer Juan de La Cosa, and in 1502 by the Portuguese Alberto Cantino, in the latter with the name "Quaresma".

Based on the written record, Fernando de Noronha island was discovered on August 10, 1503, by a Portuguese expedition, organized and financed by a private commercial consortium headed by the Lisbon merchant Fernão de Loronha. The expedition was under the overall command of captain Gonçalo Coelho and carried the Italian adventurer Amerigo Vespucci, who wrote an account of it. The flagship of the expedition hit a reef and foundered near the island. On Coelho's orders, Vespucci anchored at the island, and spent a week there, while the rest of the Coelho fleet went on south. In his letter to Soderini, Vespucci describes the uninhabited island and reports its name as the "island of St. Lawrence" (August 10 is the feast day of St. Lawrence; it was customary for explorers to name locations according to the liturgical calendar).

The island's existence was reported to Lisbon sometime between then and January 16, 1504, when King Manuel I of Portugal issued a charter granting the "island of St. John" (São João) as a hereditary captaincy to Fernão de Loronha. As Vespucci did not return to Lisbon until June 1504, historians have hypothesized that a stray ship of the Coelho fleet, under an unknown captain, may have returned to the island to collect Vespucci, did not find him or anyone else there, and went back to Lisbon by itself with the news. Vespucci, in his letter, claims that he left the island August 18, 1503, and upon his arrival in Lisbon a year later, on June 18, 1504, the people of Lisbon were surprised, as they "had been told" that his ship had been lost. The captain who returned to Lisbon with the news of the island and Vespucci's ship's loss is unknown. Some have speculated this captain was Loronha himself, the chief financier of this expedition.

This account, reconstructed from the written record, is challenged by the cartographic record. An island, named Quaresma, looking very much like Fernando de Noronha island, appears in the Cantino planisphere. The Cantino map was composed by an anonymous Portuguese cartographer, and completed before November 1502, well before the Coelho expedition even set out. This has led to speculation that the island was discovered by a previous expedition. There is no consensus on which expedition that might have been, although Roukema (1963) suggests the expedition by André Gonçalves. The name "Quaresma" means Lent, suggesting it must have been discovered in March or early April. There is also a red island to the west of Quaresma in the Cantino map that does not fit with Fernando de Noronha island. Some have explained these anomalies away by reading quaresma as anaresma, making the proposed Lent timing unnecessary, and proposing that the red island is just an accidental inkblot.

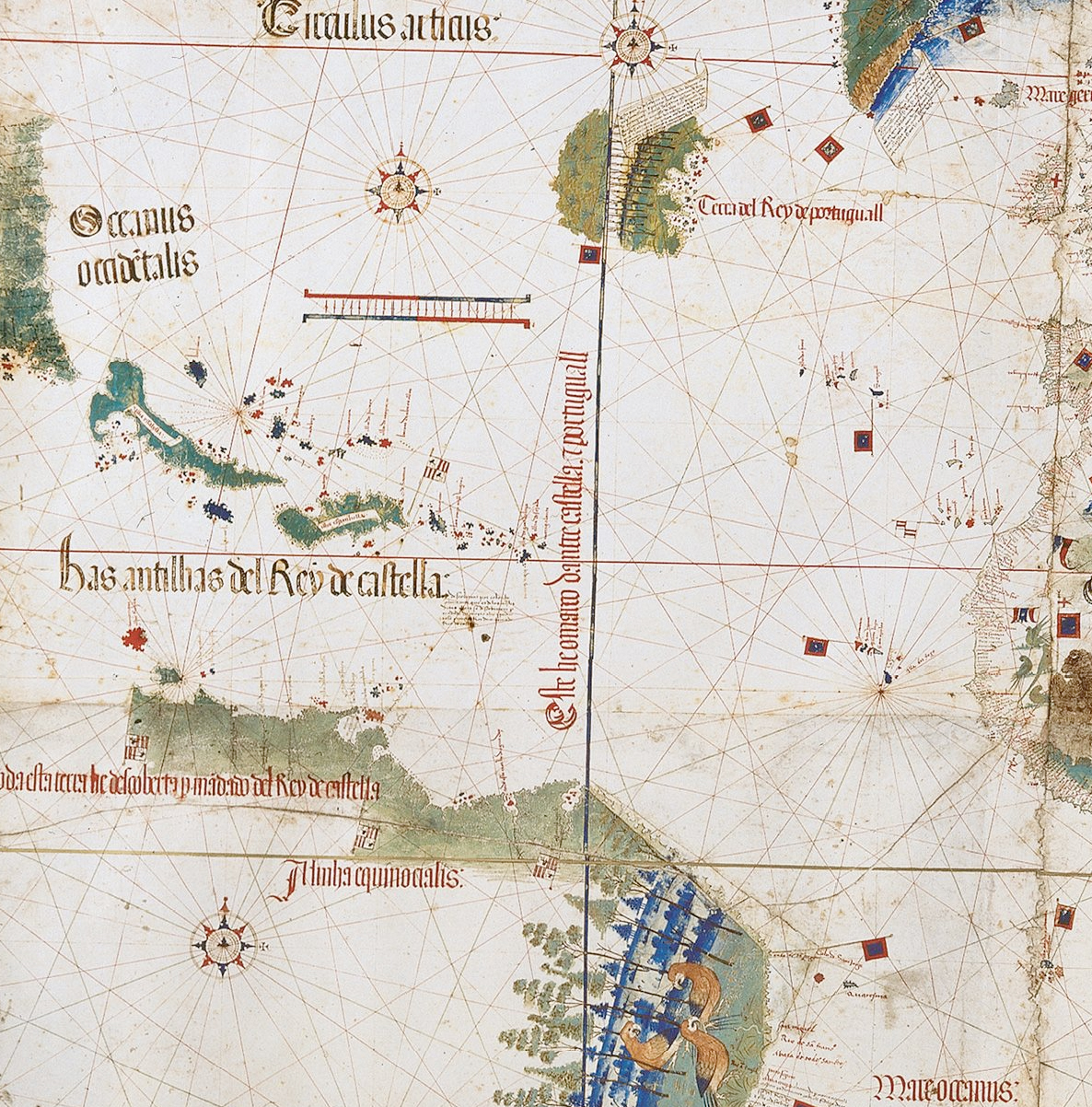
Detail from the 1502 Cantino planisphere, showing the island of "Quaresma" off the Brazilian coast.

If Quaresma is indeed Fernando de Noronha, then it is not known who discovered it. One proposal is that it was discovered by a royal Portuguese mapping expedition that was sent out in May 1501, commanded by an unknown captain (possibly André Gonçalves) and also accompanied by Amerigo Vespucci. The 1501 mapping expedition is also known as the "Third Voyage" of Amerigo Vespucci (and his first under the Portuguese flag). Vespucci relates the account of this expedition twice – first in a letter to Lorenzo di Pierfrancesco de' Medici, written in early 1503 (see account in Letter do Medici), and then again in his letters to Piero Soderini, written 1504–05 ([account] in Letter to Soderini). In his account, Vespucci does not mention the name of the captain of this 1501 mapping expedition, and his identity has been widely speculated on. The 16th-century chronicler Gaspar Correia suggests that it was André Gonçalves (Lendas da India, p.152). Greenlee (1945) conjectures that it might be Fernão de Loronha himself (a hypothesis also suggested by Duarte Leite in 1923). However, this is strongly disputed by other authors, e.g. Roukema (1963), who argue that it would be highly unlikely for a wealthy merchant like Loronha to personally command vessels himself. Loronha's support (if any) to the mapping expedition was probably limited to financing.

According to Vespucci, this expedition returned to Lisbon in September 1502, just in time to influence the final composition of the Cantino map. However, Vespucci does not report discovering this island then, instead stating that the first time he saw the island was on the 1503 Coelho expedition.

There is a letter written by Venetian emissary Pascualigo on October 12, 1502, saying that a ship arrived "from the land of Parrots" in Lisbon on July 22, 1502 (three months before Vespucci). This could be a stray ship from the mapping expedition that returned prematurely, or another expedition altogether, about which there is no information. The timing of its reputed arrival (July 1502), makes it possible that it stumbled on the island some time in March 1502, on the homeward voyage, well within Lent.

A third theory is that the island had already been discovered in 1500, shortly after the discovery of Brazil by the Second India Armada under Pedro Álvares Cabral. After his brief landfall at Porto Seguro, Cabral dispatched a supply ship under either Gaspar de Lemos or André Gonçalves (sources conflict) back to Lisbon, to report the discovery. This returning supply ship would have returned north along the Brazilian coast and might have come across Fernando de Noronha island, and reported its existence in Lisbon by July 1500. However, this contradicts the Quaresma name, since the returning supply ship was sailing well after Lent.

A fourth possibility is that it was discovered by the Third India Armada of João da Nova, which set out from Lisbon in March or April 1501, and returned in September 1502, also in time to influence the Cantino map. Chronicler Gaspar Correia asserts that on the outward voyage, the Third Armada made a stop on the Brazilian coast around Cape Santo Agostinho. Two other chroniclers (João de Barros and Damião de Góis) do not mention a landfall, but do report they discovered an island (which they believe to be identified as Ascension Island, but this is not certain). It is thus possible that the Third Armada may have discovered Fernando de Noronha island on their outward leg. However, the timing is very tight: Easter landed on April 11, 1501, while the estimated departure date of the Third Armada from Lisbon ranges from March 5 to April 15, not leaving enough time to reach those environs within Lent.

As a result of these anomalies, some modern historians have proposed that Fernando de Noronha is not depicted on the 1502 Cantino map at all. Instead, they have proposed that Quaresma island and the accompanying red "inkblot" are in fact the Rocas Atoll, slightly misplaced on the map. This reserves the discovery of Fernando de Noronha island itself as indeed on August 10, 1503, by the Gonçalo Coelho expedition, as originally reported by Vespucci. Roukema concludes that it was the Rocas Atoll that was discovered by the returning stray ship or unrecorded expedition on March 16, 1502, well within Lent.

The name "São João" eventually gave way to the initially informal name of "Fernando de Noronha". A royal letter dated May 20, 1559, to descendants of the Loronha family, still refers to the island by its official name of ilha de São João., but already in other places, e.g. the logbook of Martim Afonso de Sousa in the 1530s, it was referred to as the "island of Fernão de Noronha" ("Noronha" being a common misspelling of "Loronha"). The informal name eventually displaced the official name.

=== 1500–1700 ===
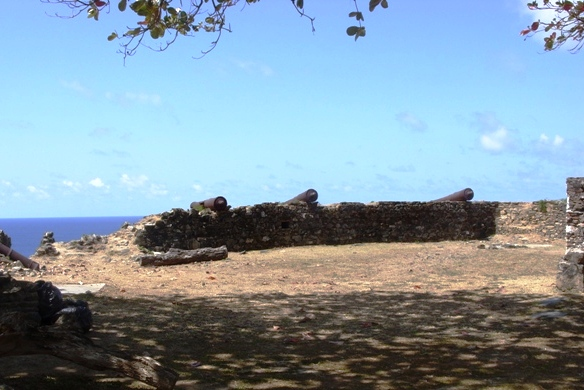
Ruins of Fort Santana

The Lisbon merchant Fernão de Loronha held not only Fernando de Noronha island as a hereditary captaincy but also (from 1503 to around 1512) a commercial monopoly on trade in Brazil. Between 1503 and 1512, Noronha's agents set up a string of warehouses (feitorias) along the Brazilian coast, and engaged in trade with the indigenous peoples in Brazil for brazilwood, a native red dye wood highly valued by European cloth-makers. Fernando de Noronha island was the central collection point of this network. Brazilwood, continuously harvested by the coastal Indians and delivered to the various coastal warehouses, was shipped to the central warehouse on Fernando de Noronha island, which was intermittently visited by a larger transport ship that would carry the collected loads back to Europe. After the expiration of Loronha's commercial charter in 1512, the organization of the brazilwood enterprise was taken over by the Portuguese crown, but Loronha and his descendants retained private ownership of Fernando de Noronha island itself as a hereditary captaincy, at least down to the 1560s.

=== 1700–1900 ===
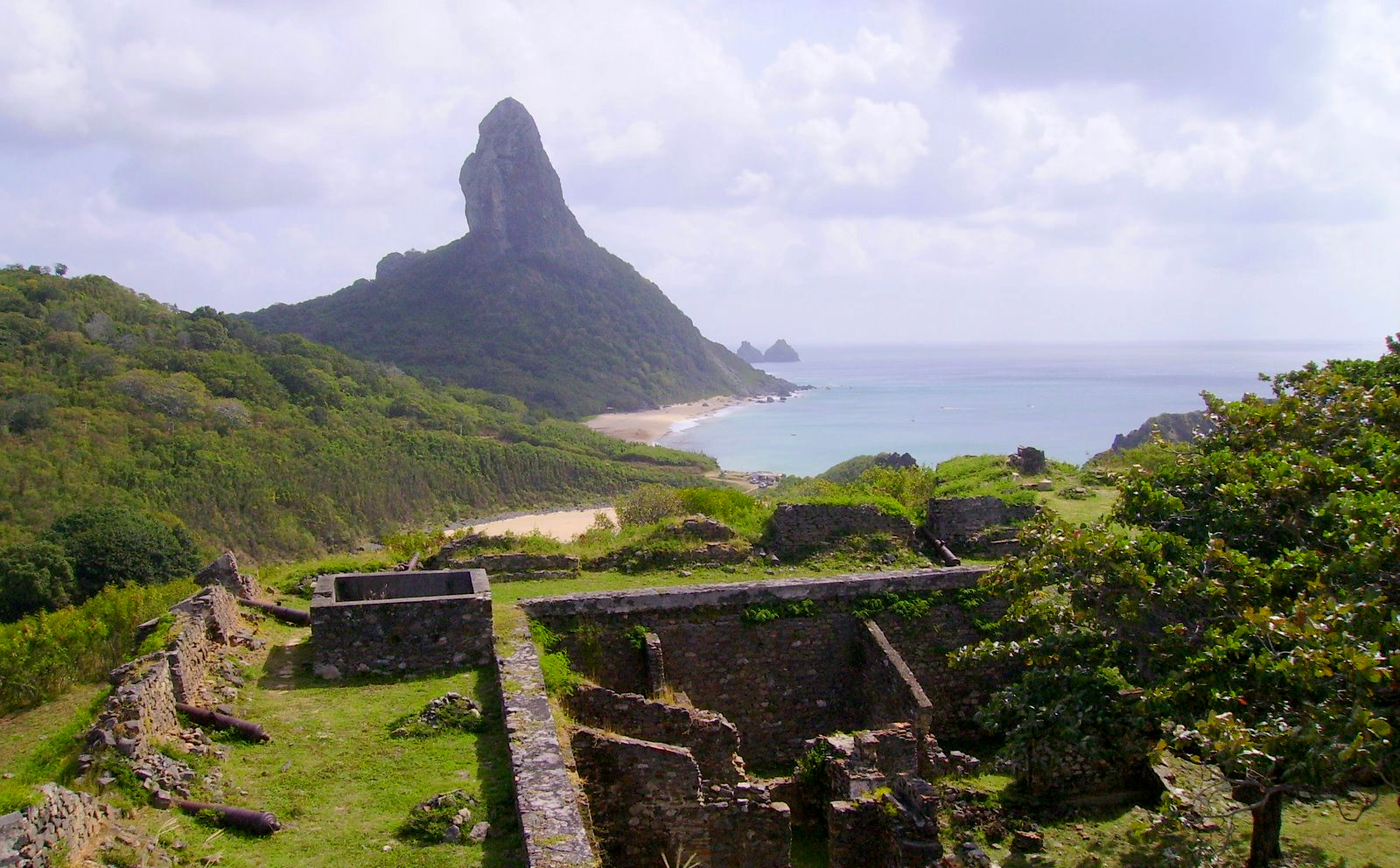
Fort of Nossa Senhora dos Remédios

In July 1719, the Welsh pirate Bartholomew Roberts, also known as "Black Bart," was present on the island for a total of nine weeks, before heading off in search of Portuguese ships in the West Indies.

==== French occupation ====
In 1736, the French East India Company sent an expedition commanded by Captain Lesquelin, with troops and resources to colonise the island. When finding out that the French had colonised the island, the Viceroy of Brazil, the Count of Galveias, sent scouts that verified the occupation, on 26 September 1736. King John V of Portugal determined that the French troops and colonisers were expelled, dispatching a royal charter on 26 May 1737 designating the Governor of Pernambuco, Henrique Luís Pereira Freire de Andrade, to comply with the resolution. At the same time, the Count of Galveias prepared an expedition with 250 soldiers, commanded by Colonel João Lobo de Lacerda, that sailed from Recife on 6 October 1737. Lacerda successfully expelled the French without resistance and returned to Recife on 11 July 1738.

Captain Henry Foster stopped at Fernando de Noronha during his scientific survey expedition as commander of HMS Chanticleer, which had set out in 1828. As well as surveying coasts and ocean currents, Foster used a Kater invariable pendulum to make observations on gravity. He took the island as the point of junction of his double line of longitudes setting out his survey. He was given considerable assistance by the Governor of Fernando Noronha who let Foster use part of his own house for the pendulum experiments. The longitude of Rio de Janeiro taken by Foster was among those on one side of a significant discrepancy, which meant that the charts of South America were in doubt.

Map of Fernando de Noronha, 1886.

To resolve this, the Admiralty instructed Captain Robert FitzRoy to command HMS Beagle on a survey expedition. One of its essential tasks was a stop at Fernando Noronha to confirm its exact longitude, using the 22 chronometers on board the ship to give the precise time of observations. They arrived at the island in the late evening of 19 February 1832, anchoring at midnight. On 20 February FizRoy landed a small party to take the observations, despite difficulties caused by heavy surf, then sailed on for Bahia, Brazil that evening.

During the day, the island was visited by the naturalist Charles Darwin, who was one of the Beagle's passengers. He took notes for his book on geology. He wrote about admiring the woods:

"The whole island is one forest, & this is so thickly intertwined that it requires great exertion to crawl along. — The scenery was very beautiful, & large Magnolias & Laurels & trees covered with delicate flowers ought to have satisfied me. — But I am sure all the grandeur of the Tropics has not yet been seen by me. — We had no gaudy birds, No humming birds. No large flowers".

His experiences on Fernando de Noronha were recorded in his journal, later published as The Voyage of the Beagle. He also included a short description of the island in his 1844 Geological Observations on the Volcanic Islands visited during the voyage of H.M.S. Beagle.

The island was also used as a penal colony in the 19th century.

=== 1900–present ===
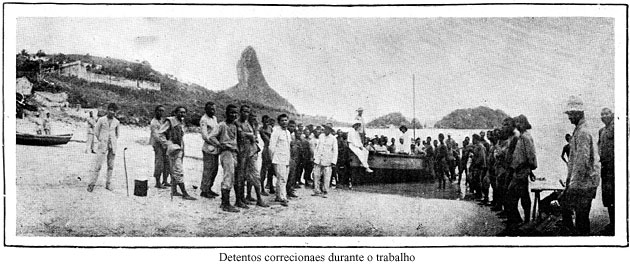
Island prisoners in 1930.

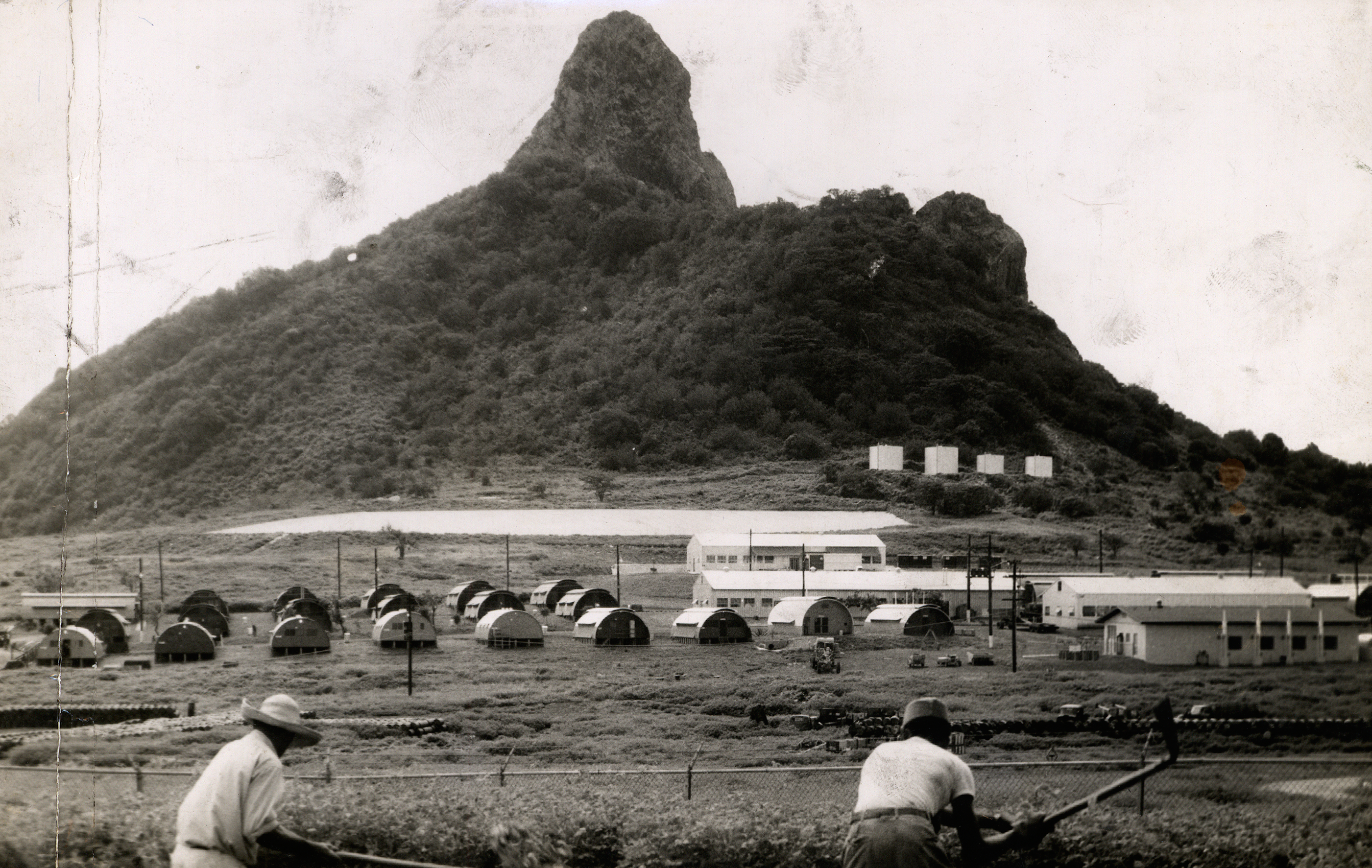
A U.S. military base in Fernando de Noronha, 1959

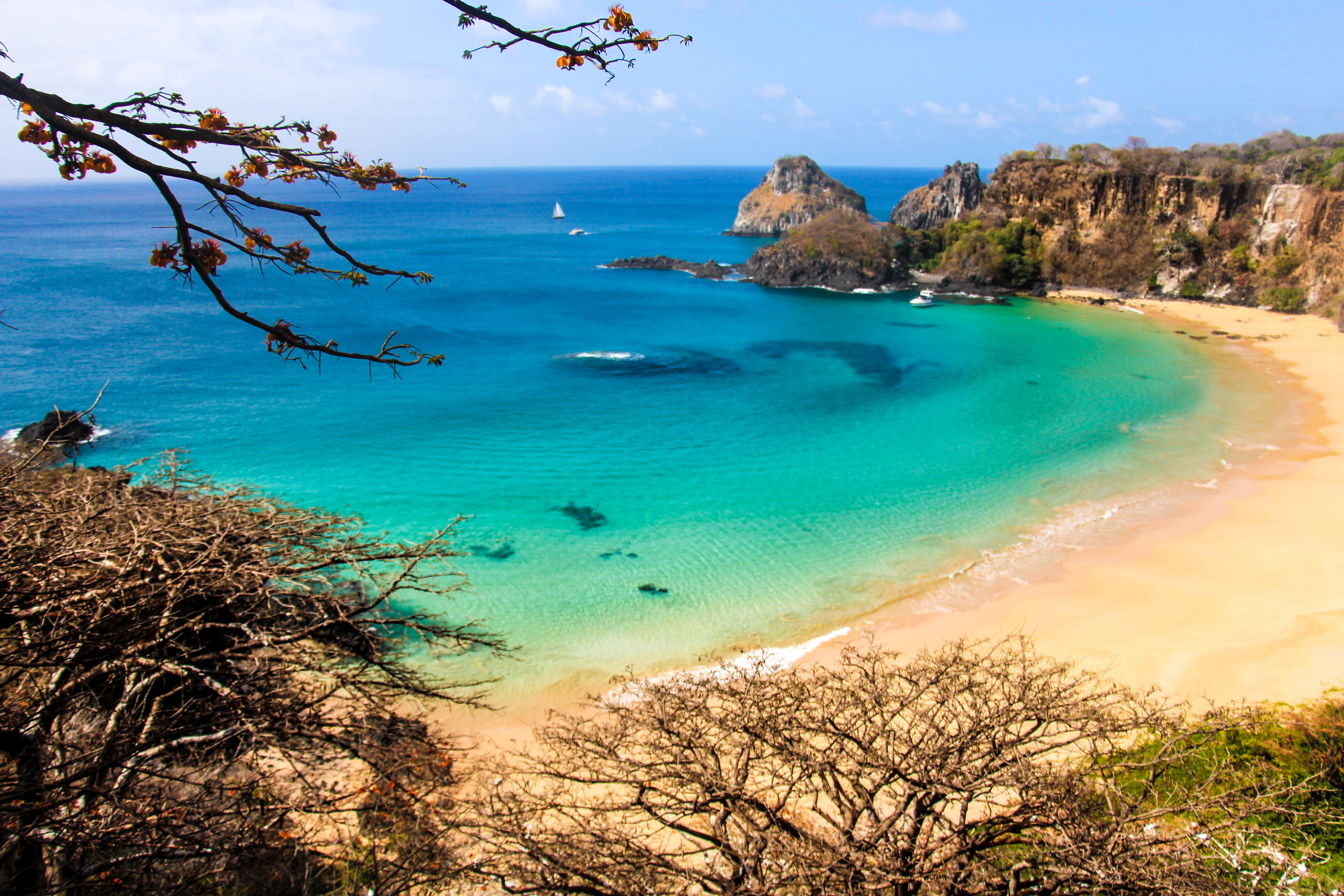
Sancho Bay

In the late 18th century, the first prisoners were sent to Fernando de Noronha. A prison was built. In 1897 the government of the state of Pernambuco took possession of the prison. Between 1938 and 1945, Fernando de Noronha was a political prison. In 1957 the prison was closed and the archipelago was visited by President Juscelino Kubitschek. However, in 1964 after a military coup, Miguel Arraes was incarcerated there for his refusal to resign as governor of Pernambuco.

At the beginning of the 20th century, the British arrived to provide technical cooperation in telegraphy (The South American Company). Later the French came with the French Cable and the Italians with Italcable.

In 1942, during World War II, the archipelago was made a federal territory, which included Rocas Atoll and Saint Peter and Paul Rocks. The government sent political and ordinary prisoners to the local prison.

An airport was constructed in September 1942 by the United States Army Air Forces Air Transport Command for the Natal-Dakar air route. It provided a transoceanic link between Brazil and French West Africa for cargo, transiting aircraft and personnel during the Allies campaign in Africa. Brazil transferred the airport to the jurisdiction of the United States Navy on 5 September 1944. After the end of the war, the administration of the airport was transferred back to the Brazilian Government.

The geographic position of the airport averted a major air disaster on July 21, 1950. A BOAC Canadair C-4 Argonaut, with a crew of 7 and 12 passengers, en route to Natal from Dakar encountered severe engine problems which resulted, at one point, in both engines on the starboard wing being shut down. With only two functioning engines on the port wing, the reduction in power output caused the aircraft to steadily lose altitude from its normal cruising altitude of 20,000 ft (6,096 m) at a rate of 400 ft/min (2.03 m/s). A further difficulty was that the propeller on the inboard engine could not be feathered, which significantly increased aircraft drag. The crew also had to cope with a persistent fire on the same engine. As a result, the Captain ordered an SOS to be issued. The crew realised that they might not be able to reach Natal and would have to ditch in the South Atlantic. Consequently, the Captain decided to divert to Fernando de Noronha, 480 miles (773 km) to the southwest. En-route the crew managed to restart the outboard engine and this enabled the aircraft to maintain an altitude of 9,000 ft (2,743 m). Although there were problems with coolant temperature on the port wing engines plus difficulties in locating the small archipelago, the crew nursed the Argonaut to a safe landing at Fernando de Noronha, some four hours after their ordeal began.

Nowadays, Fernando de Noronha Airport is served by daily flights from Recife and Natal on the Brazilian coast.

In 1988, Brazil designated approximately 70% of the archipelago as a maritime national park, with the goal of preserving the land and sea environment. On October 5, 1988, the Federal Territory was dissolved and added to the state of Pernambuco (except Rocas Atoll, which was added to the state of Rio Grande do Norte).

Today Fernando de Noronha's economy depends on tourism, restricted by the limitations of its delicate ecosystem. In addition to the historical interest noted above, the archipelago has been the subject of the attention of various scientists dedicated to the study of its flora, fauna, geology, etc. The jurisdiction is considered to be a separate "entity" by the DX Century Club, and so is visited rather often by amateur radio operators.

In 2001, the United Nations Educational, Scientific and Cultural Organization (UNESCO) declared Fernando de Noronha, with Rocas Atoll, a World Heritage Site. It cited the following reasons:

a) the island's importance as a feeding ground for several species, including tuna, billfish, cetaceans, sharks, and marine turtles,
b) a high population of resident spinner dolphins and
c) protection for endangered species, such as the hawksbill sea turtle (critically endangered) and various birds.

In 2009, Air France Flight 447 crashed into the Atlantic Ocean off Fernando de Noronha. Rescue and recovery operations were launched from the island. Bodies and debris from the Airbus A330 operating the flight were recovered within five days. All 228 people on board were killed. The crash had been caused by the flight crew's inappropriate response to inaccurate airspeed readings due to the pitot tubes being blocked, with the first officer (who was the pilot flying) pulling the nose up, which caused the aircraft to enter a stall and crash.

== Geography ==
=== Geology ===
The islands of this archipelago are the visible parts of a range of submerged mountains. It consists of 21 islands, islets and rocks of volcanic origin. The main island has an area of 18 km^{2} (6.9 sq mi), being 10 km (5.4 nmi; 6.2 mi) long and 3.5 km (1.9 nmi; 2.2 mi) wide at its maximum. The base of this enormous volcanic formation is 756 m (2,480 ft) below the surface. The volcanic rocks are of variable, though mainly silica-undersaturated, character with basanite, nephelinite and phonolite among the lava types found. The main island, from which the group gets its name, makes up 91% of the total area; the islands of Rata, Sela Gineta, Cabeluda and São José, together with the islets of Leão and Viúva make up the rest. The central upland of the main island is called the Quixaba.

=== Flora ===
The United Nations Environment Programme lists 15 possible endemic plant species, including species of the genera Capparis noronhae (two species), Ceratosanthes noronhae (three species), Cayaponia noronhae (two species), Moriordica noronhae, Cereus insularis, Palicourea noronhae, Guettarda noronhae, Bumelia noronhae, Physalis noronhae, and Ficus noronhae.

=== Fauna ===
The islands have two endemic birds: the Noronha elaenia (Elaenia ridleyana) and the Noronha vireo (Vireo gracilirostris). Both are present on the main island; the Noronha vireo is also present on Ilha Rata. In addition there is an endemic subspecies of eared dove (Zenaida auriculata noronha). Subfossil remains of an extinct endemic rail have also been found. The archipelago is also an important site for breeding seabirds. An endemic sigmodontine rodent (Noronhomys vespuccii), mentioned by Amerigo Vespucci, is now extinct. The islands have two endemic reptiles, the Noronha wormlizard (Amphisbaena ridleyi) and the Noronha skink (Trachylepis atlantica).

=== Marine life ===
The life above and below sea is the main attraction of the island. Sea turtles, cetaceans (most common among these are spinner dolphins and humpback whales, followed by many others such as pantropical spotted dolphins, short-finned pilot whales, and melon-headed whales), albatrosses, and many other species are frequently observed.

=== Climate ===
Fernando de Noronha has a tropical wet and dry climate (Aw/As), with two well-defined seasons for rainfall, if not temperature. The rainy season lasts from February to July; the rest of the year sees little rain. The temperature ranges, both diurnal and monthly, are unusually slight.

Climate data for Fernando de Noronha (1961–1990)
Month	Jan	Feb	Mar	Apr	May	Jun	Jul	Aug	Sep	Oct	Nov	Dec	Year
Mean daily maximum °C (°F)	29.8 (85.6)	30 (86)	29.7 (85.5)	29.6 (85.3)	29.2 (84.6)	28.7 (83.7)	28.1 (82.6)	28.1 (82.6)	28.7 (83.7)	29.1 (84.4)	29.5 (85.1)	29.8 (85.6)	29.2 (84.6)
Daily mean °C (°F)	27 (81)	27.1 (80.8)	26.9 (80.4)	26.7 (80.1)	26.6 (79.9)	26.2 (79.2)	25.7 (78.3)	25.7 (78.3)	26 (79)	26.3 (79.3)	26.6 (79.9)	27 (81)	26.5 (79.7)
Mean daily minimum °C (°F)	24.9 (76.8)	24.8 (76.6)	24.6 (76.3)	24.5 (76.1)	24.5 (76.1)	24.2 (75.6)	23.8 (74.8)	23.8 (74.8)	24.1 (75.4)	24.4 (75.9)	24.6 (76.3)	24.9 (76.8)	24.4 (75.9)
Average rainfall mm (inches)	63.1 (2.48)	110.6 (4.35)	263.6 (10.38)	290.3 (11.43)	280.3 (11.04)	190.2 (7.49)	122 (4.8)	37 (1.5)	18.5 (0.73)	12 (0.5)	13 (0.5)	17.8 (0.70)	1,418.4 (55.9)
Mean monthly sunshine hours	250.6	209.3	189.5	238.8	208.4	222.5	224.7	260.2	265	285.3	281.5	271.2	2,907
Source: Climate Charts/NOAA.

=== Conservation and environmental threats ===
Most of the original large trees were cut down in the 19th century, when the island was used as a prison, for firewood and to keep the prisoners from hiding and making rafts.

Also, exotic species have been introduced:

- Linseed, intended for use as cattle feed.
- Tegu lizards (Tupinambis merianae, locally known as teju) introduced in the 1950s to control a rat infestation. It did not work because Tegus are diurnal and rats, nocturnal. The lizards are now considered a plague, feeding mostly on bird eggs.
- Rock cavies (Kerodon rupestris, locally known as mocó) introduced by the military in the 1960s as hunting game for soldiers.
- Domestic cats, introduced as pets, now they spread throughout the whole island and several acquired a feral status, surviving only by preying on native birds, rock cavies and synanthropic rodents.

From these, the domestic cat and the tegu lizard have become invasive.

The island is divided between the Fernando de Noronha Marine National Park and the Fernando de Noronha Environmental Protection Area. The latter covers the urban, tourist area.

== Energy ==
Until 2025, energy production in the Fernando de Noronha archipelago is carried out at the Tubarão plant, which runs on biodiesel.

In November 2025, the archipelago's first floating solar plant is inaugurated, built by Neoenergia (Iberdrola's subsidiary in Brazil) and Companhia Pernambucana de Saneamento (Compesa).

This plant is located on the water surface of the Xaréu reservoir. It has a capacity of 622 kWp and an estimated annual generation of 1,083 MWh. The installation will prevent the emission of 717 tons of CO₂.

The Noronha Verde project has also been launched, developed by Neoenergia, aiming to make Fernando de Noronha the first inhabited oceanic island in Latin America to achieve a 100% sustainable energy model. It consists of a photovoltaic plant with more than 30,000 panels and a capacity of 22 MWp, which will be integrated with a 49 MWh battery storage system.

== Economy ==
Tourism including dolphin watching, diving, and charter fishing comprise the majority of the island's economy.

=== Economic indicators ===
HDI (2000)	Population (2012)	GDP (2007)	% PE	GDP pc	Hostel/pousada beds (2006)
0.862	2,718	R$20,901,000	0.034%	R$7,462	1,492

The archipelago of Fernando de Noronha in 2005 had a gross domestic product (GDP) of R$22,802,000 and a per capita income of R$10,001. In 2000, the United Nations Development Programme estimated the Fernando de Noronha state district's Human Development Index (HDI) at 0.862. The only two banking centers in the archipelago are a branch of Banco Santander Brasil and a branch of Banco Bradesco. There are one or two additional automated teller machines (ATMs) around the main island.

== Tourism ==
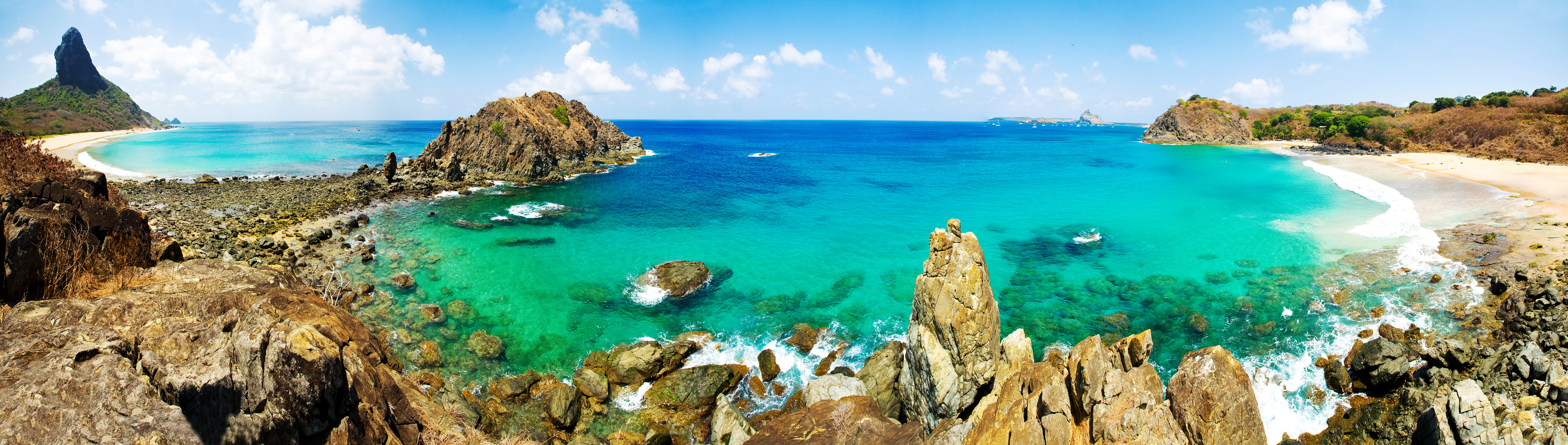
Cachorro Beach

The beaches of Fernando de Noronha are promoted for tourism and recreational diving. The most popular ones include Baía do Sancho, Pig Bay, Dolphins Bay, Sueste Bay and Praia do Leão. Due to the South Equatorial Current that pushes warm water from Africa to the island, diving to depths of 30 to 40 m (98 to 131 ft) does not require a wetsuit. The visibility underwater can reach up to 50 m (164 ft).

The part of the island facing the mainland has the beaches in the following order: Baía do Sancho, Baía dos Porcos, Praia da Cacimba do Padre, Praia do Bode, Praia dos Americanos, Praia do Boldró, Praia da Conceição, Praia do Meio and Praia do Cachorro. The part of the island facing the Atlantic Ocean has only three beaches: Praia do Leão, Praia do Sueste and Praia do Atalaia. A great way to get to know the island is to walk from Praia dos Americanos, pass by Praia do Boldró, Praia da Conceição, Praia do Meio and finish the walking at Praia do Cachorro.

The island is served by Governador Carlos Wilson Airport with regular flights to Natal and Recife.

== Gallery ==
Map of the Archipelago

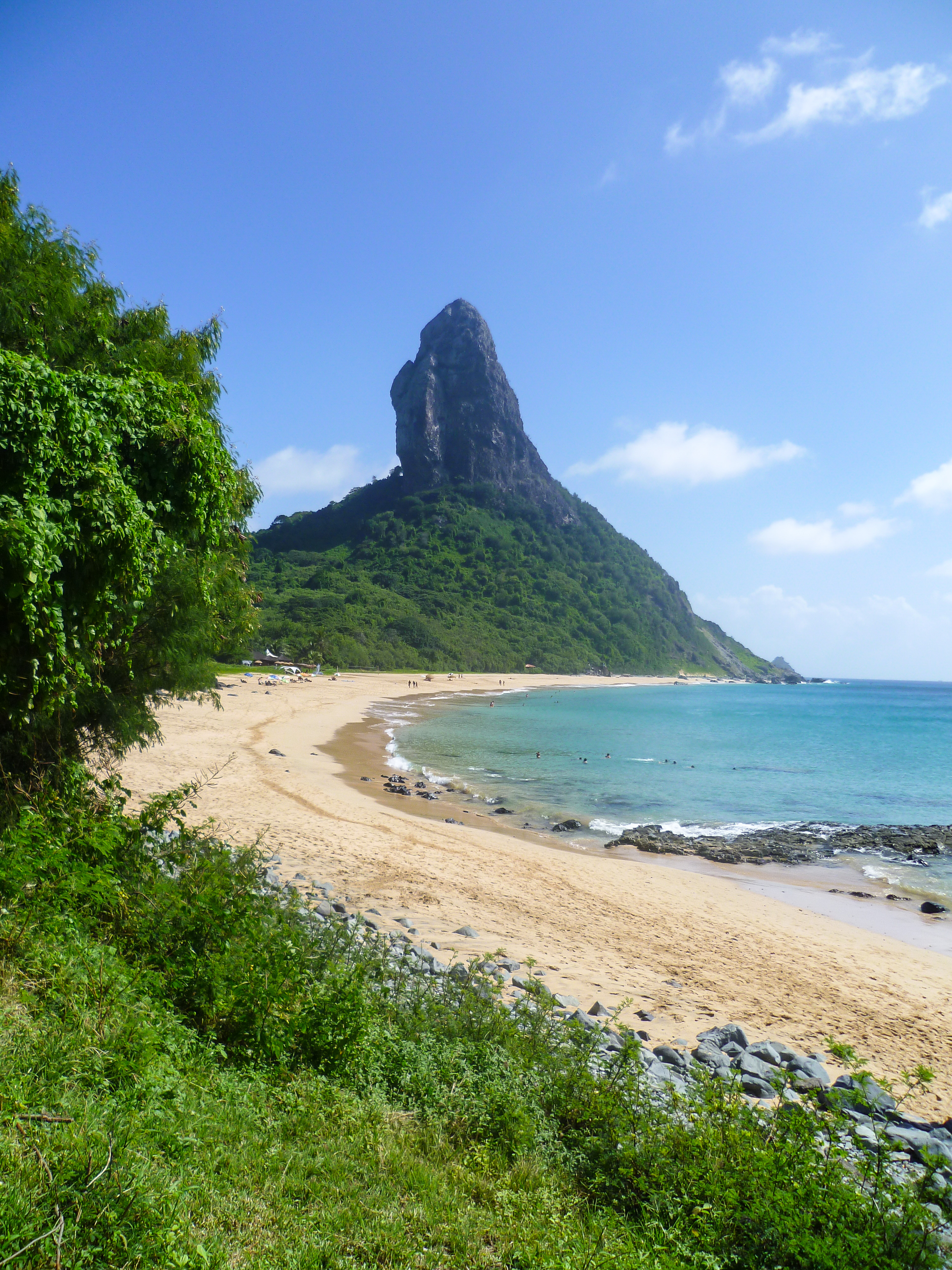
Fernando de Noronha Conceição beach

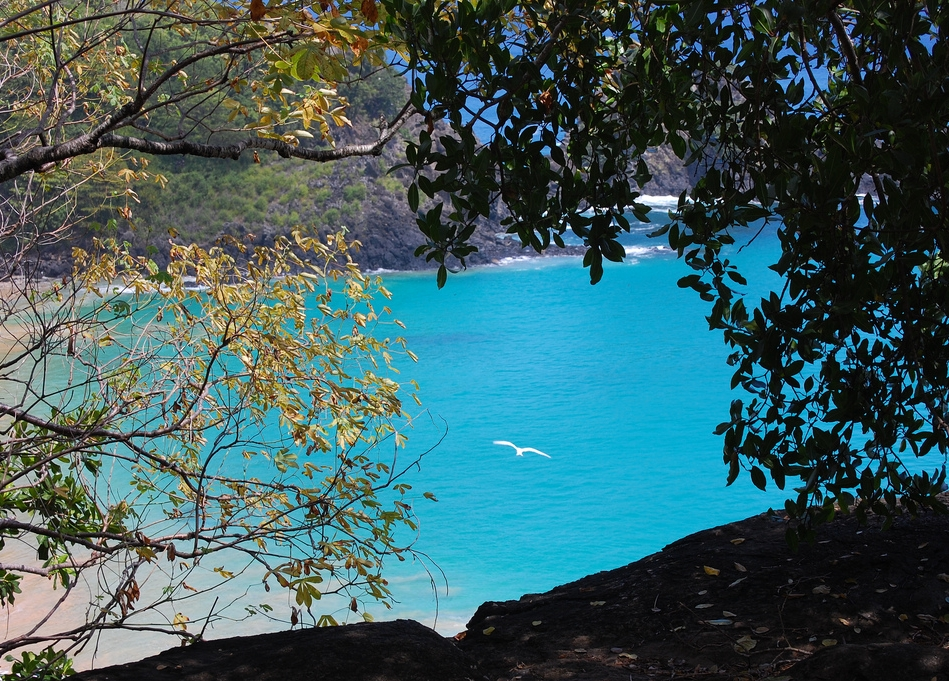
Landscape in Fernando de Noronha

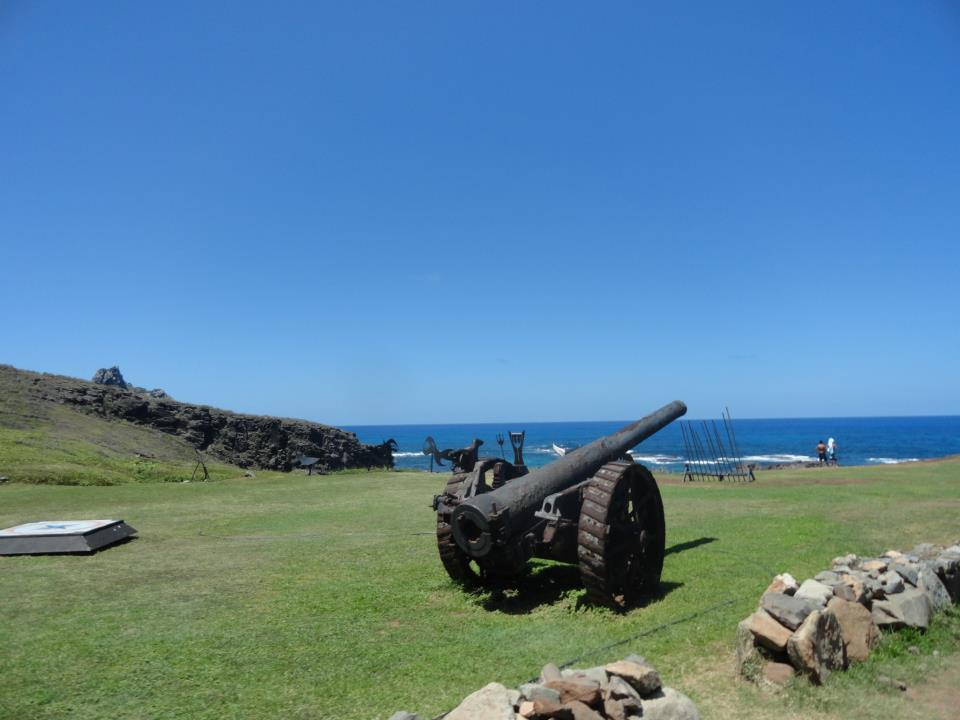
Historic fortifications

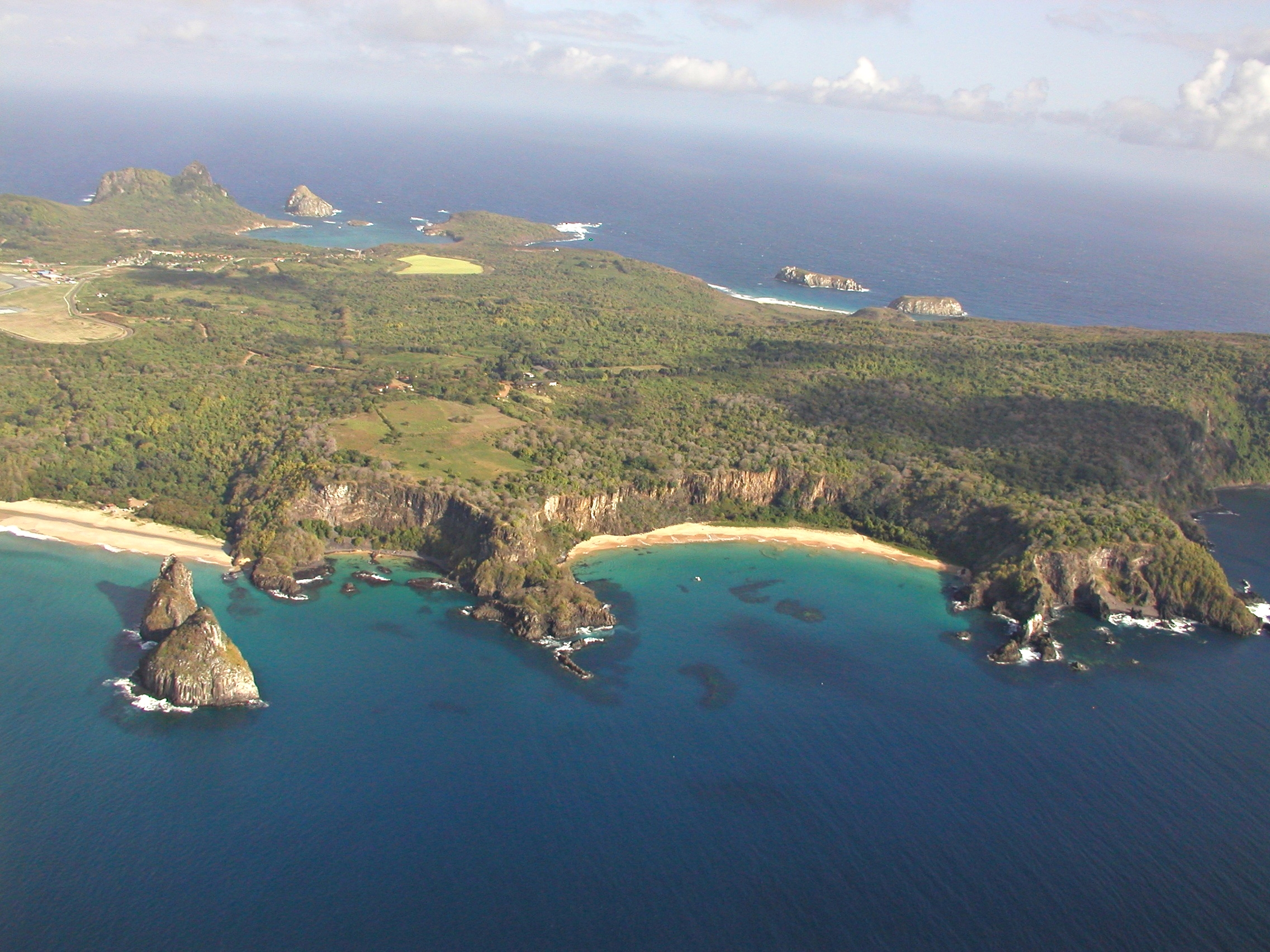
Aerial view

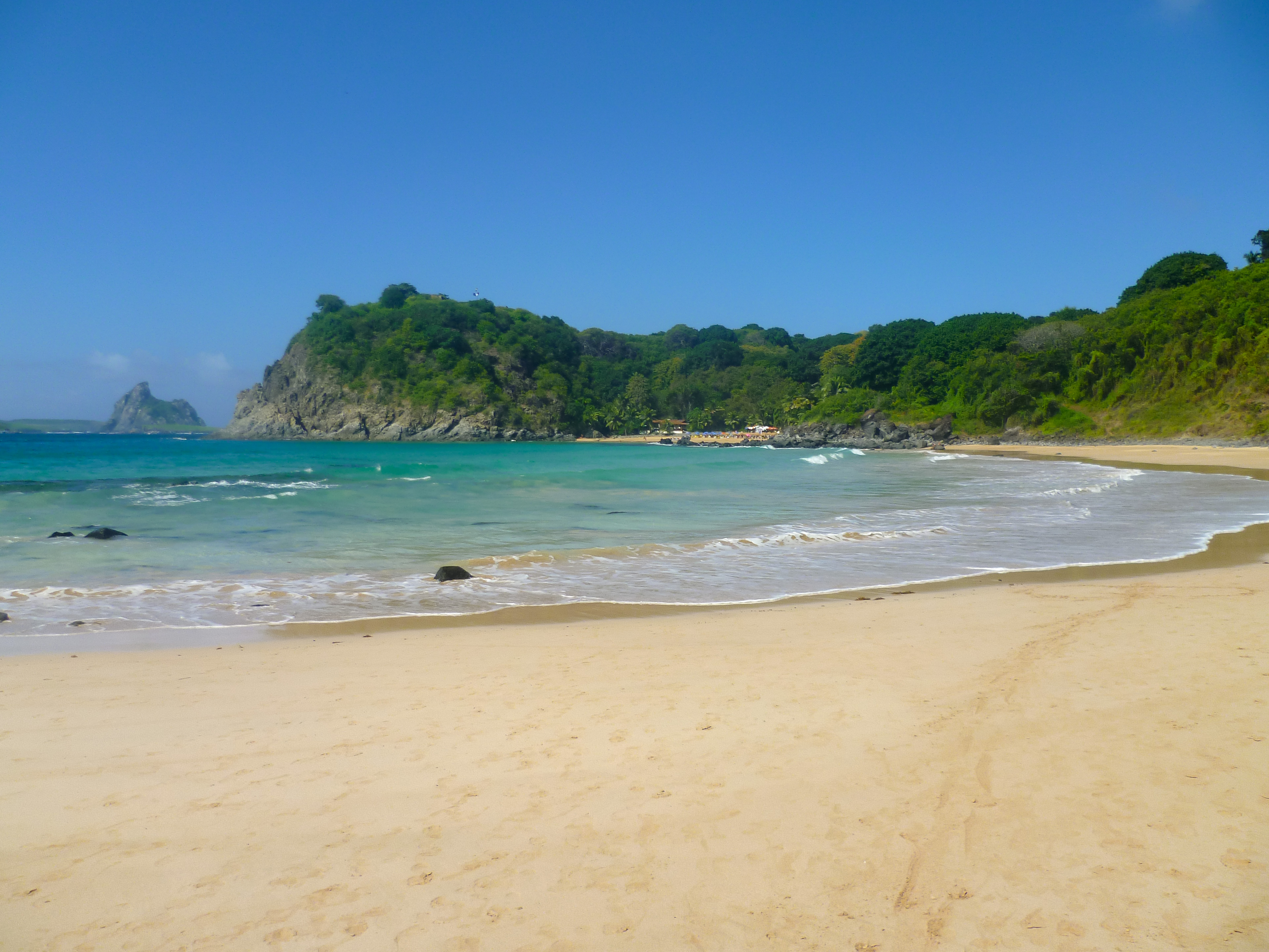
Fernando de Noronha beach

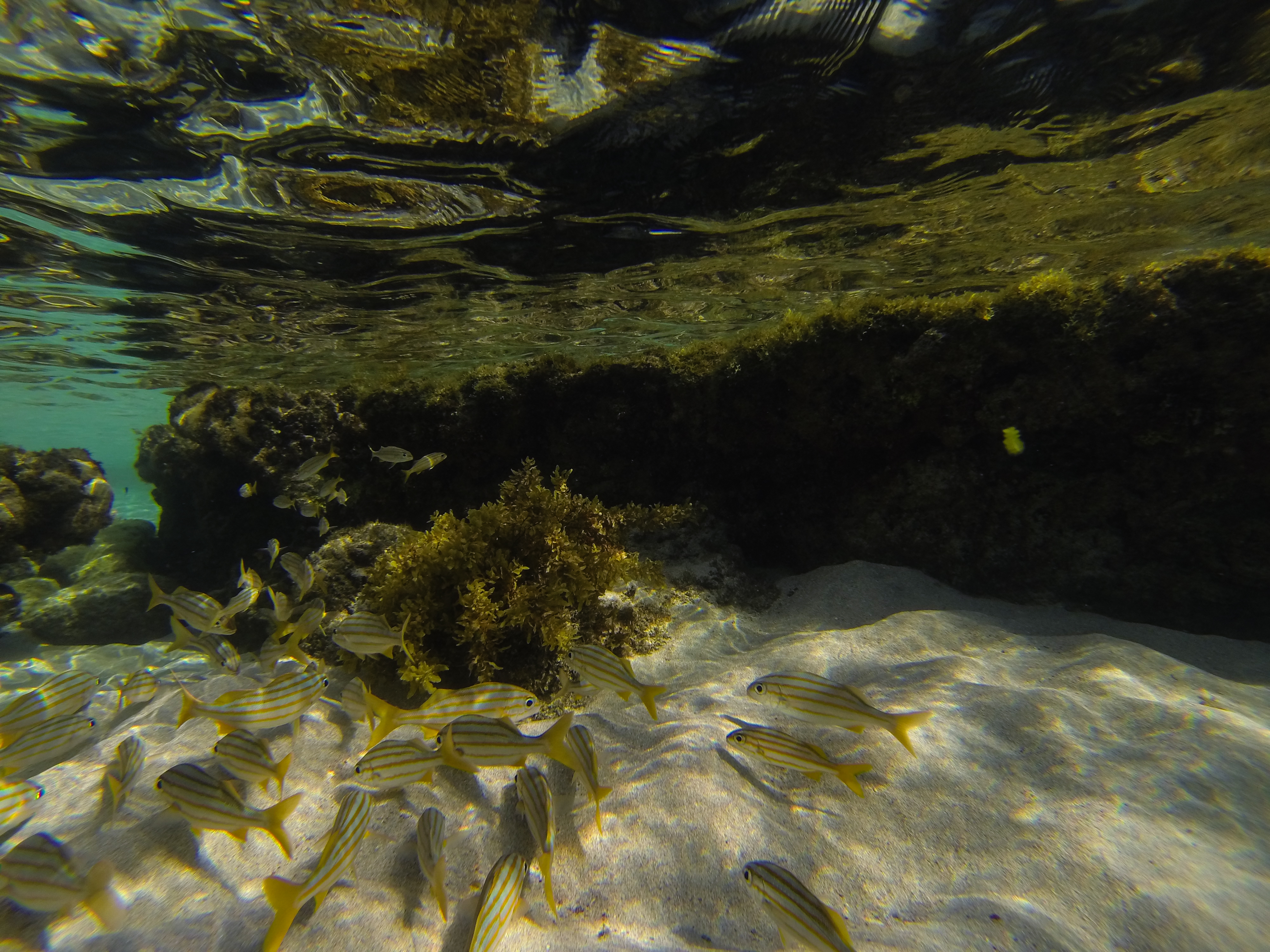
Crystalline water

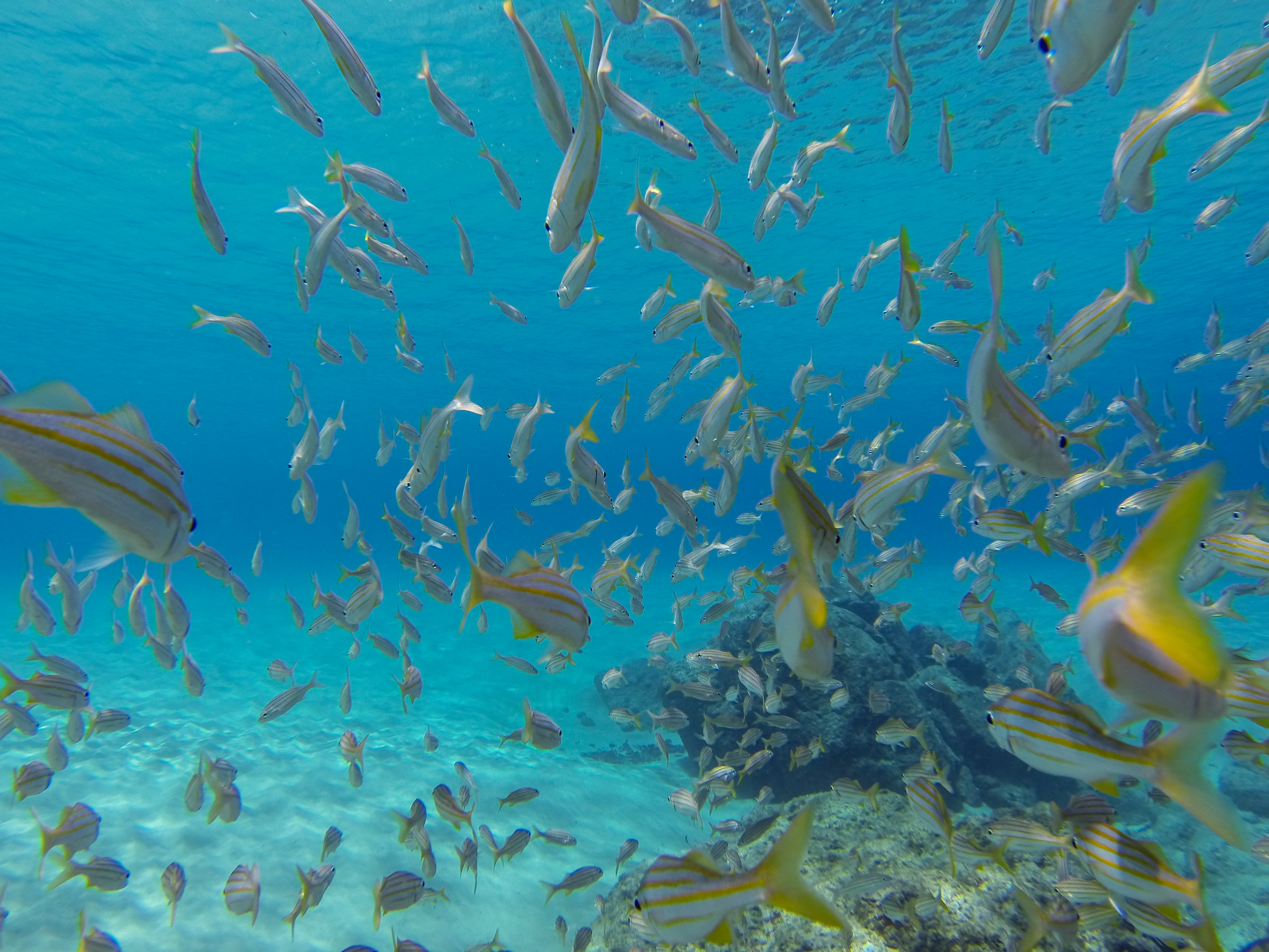
Underwater

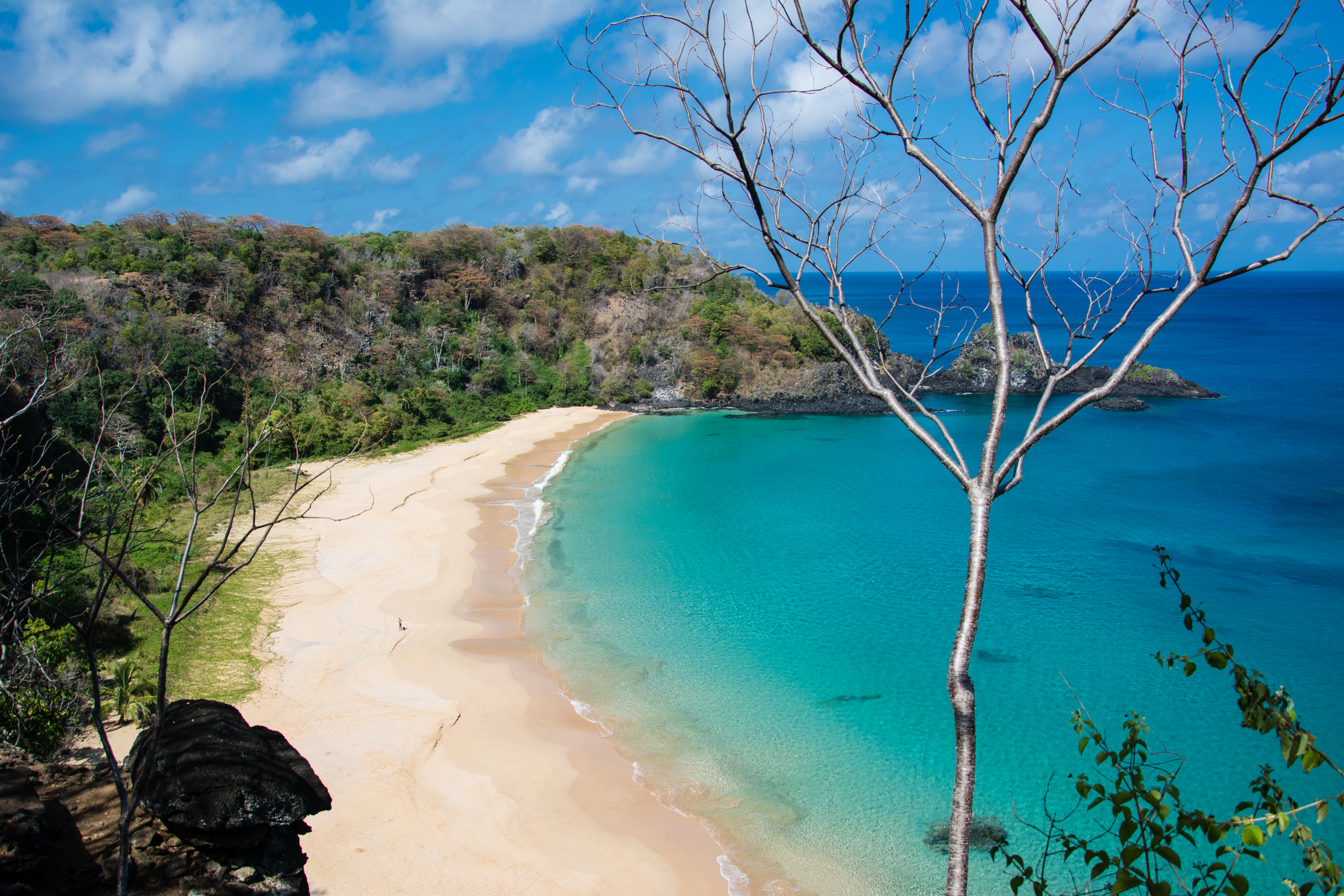
Sancho Bay

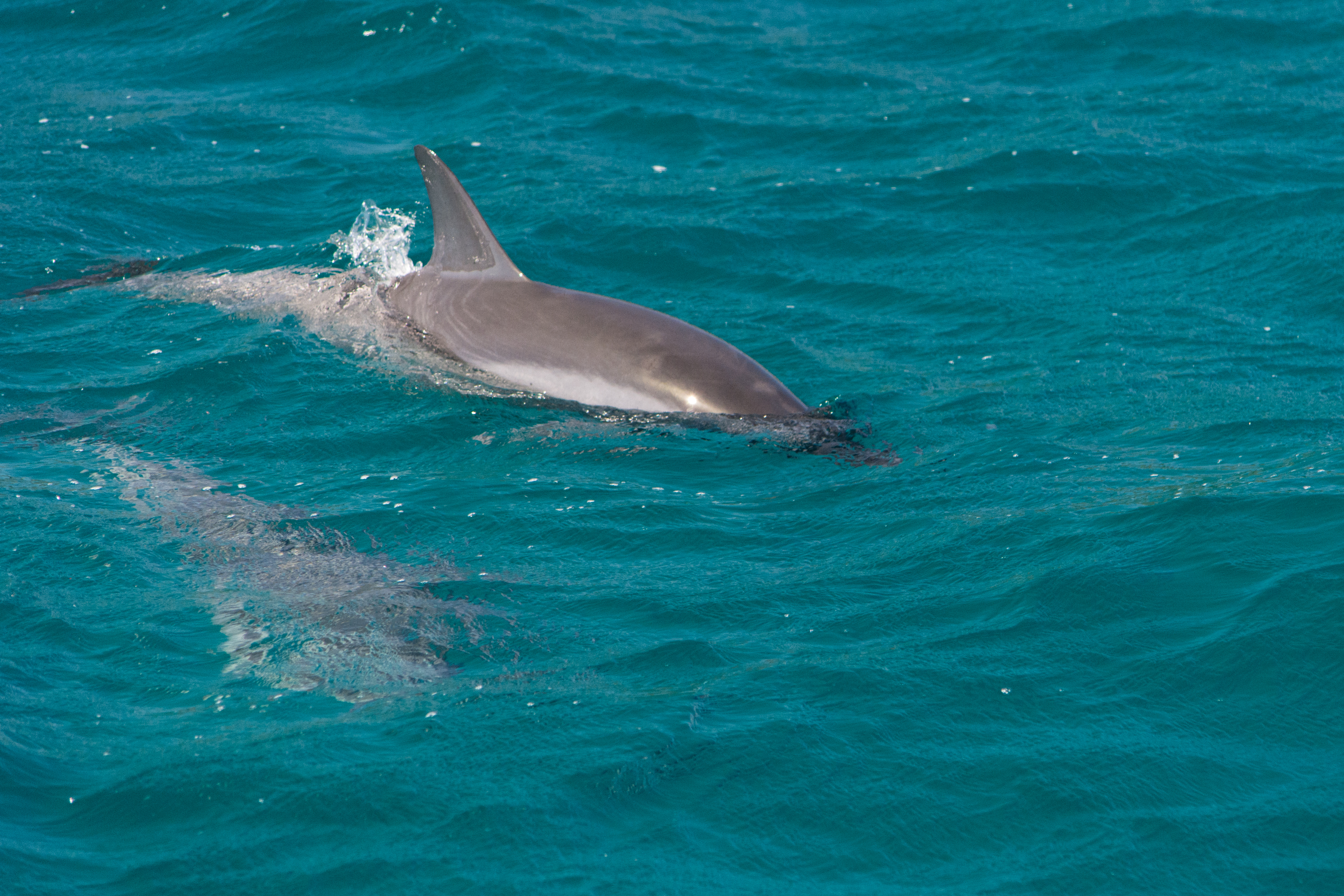
Spinner dolphins in Dolphin Bay

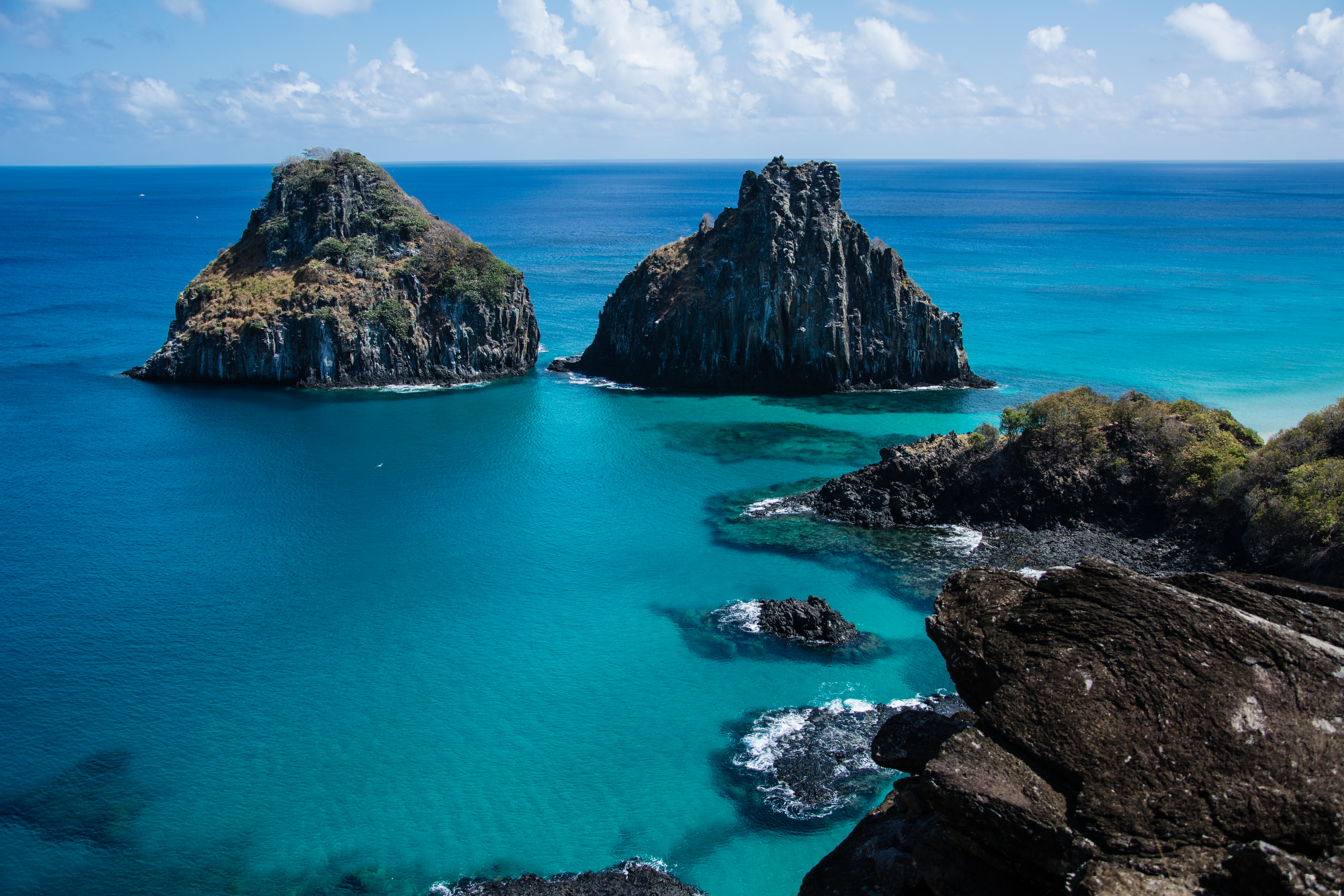
Two Brothers Rock (Morro Dois Irmãos)

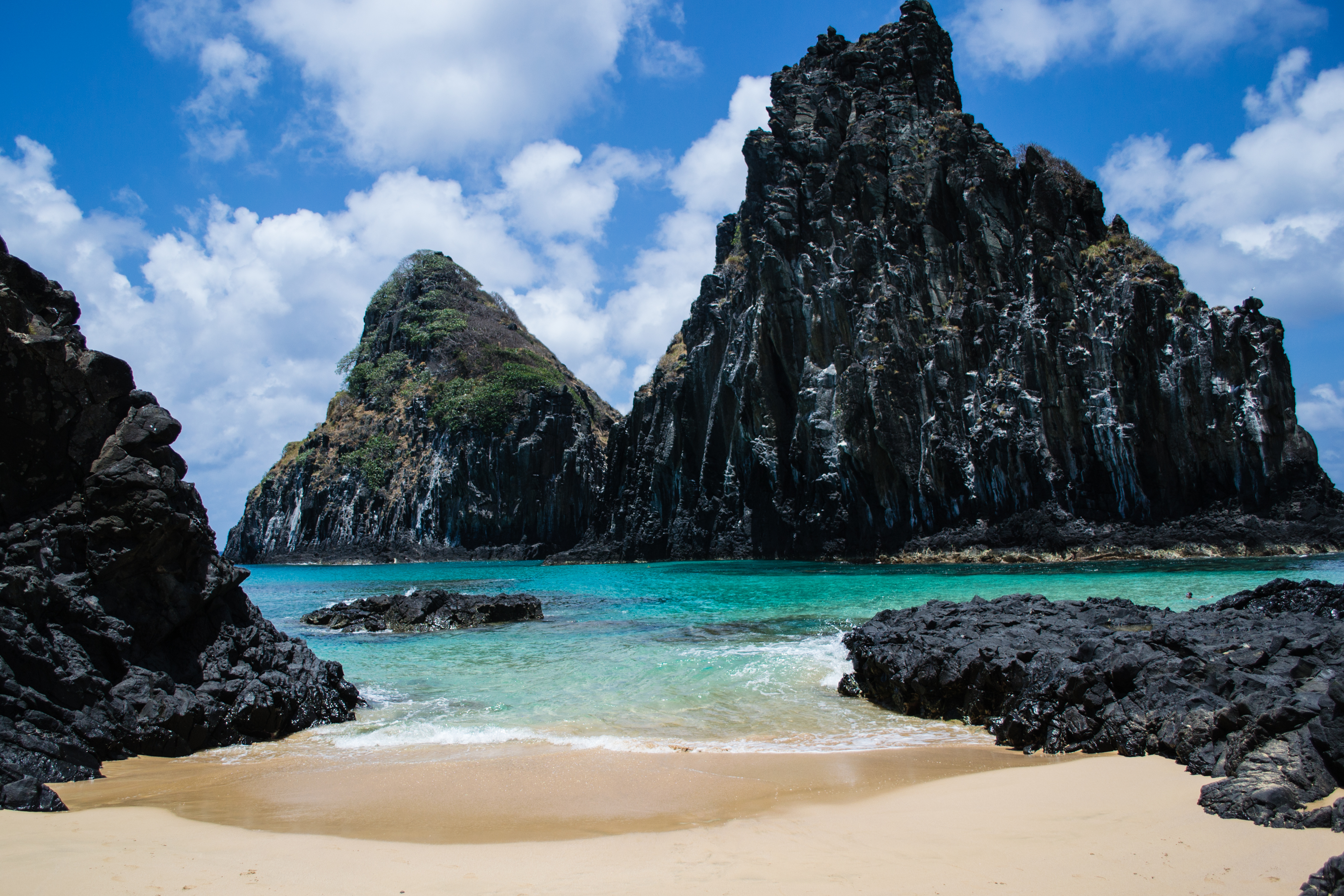
Cacimba do Padre

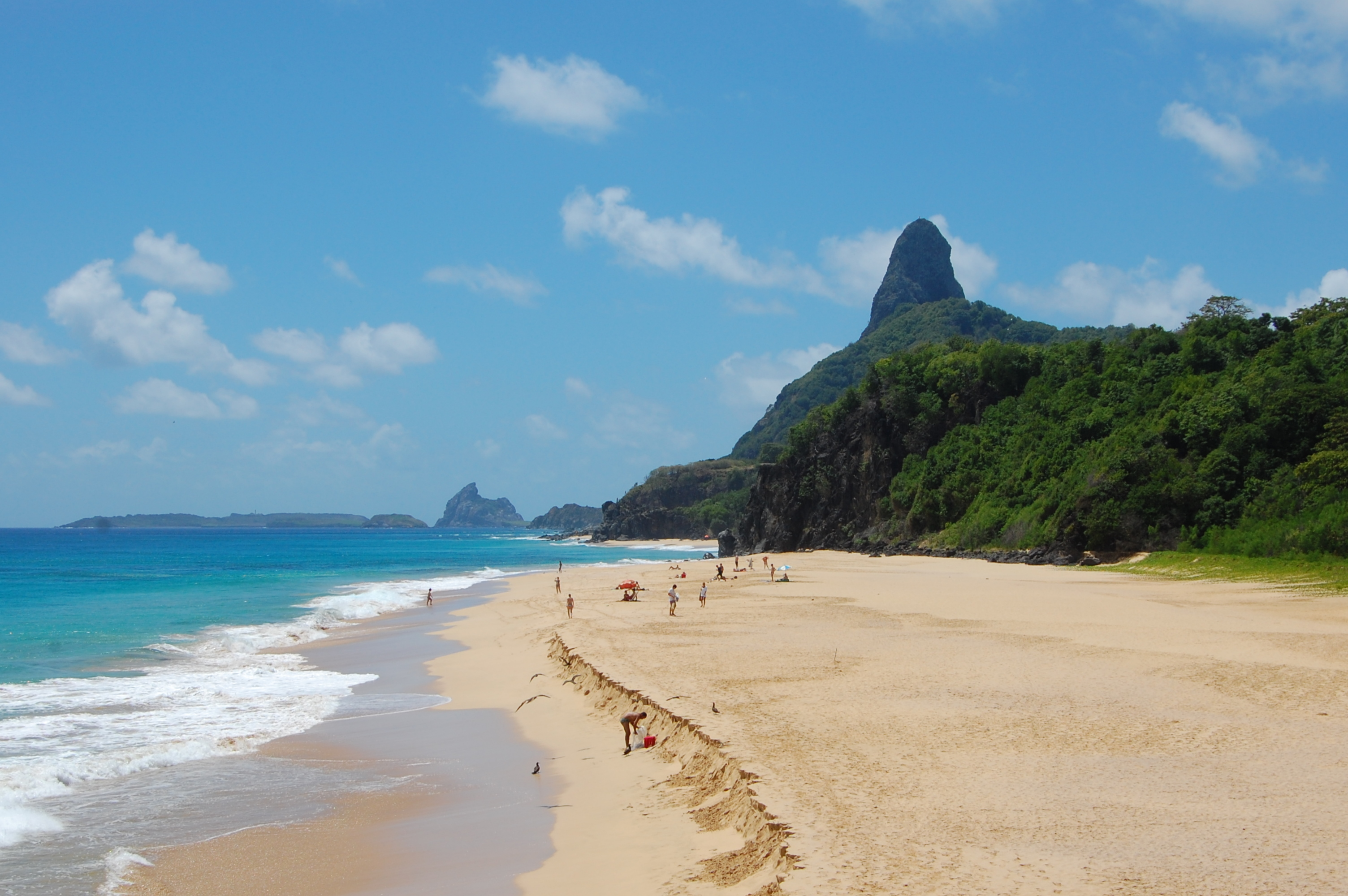
Cacimba do Padre Beach

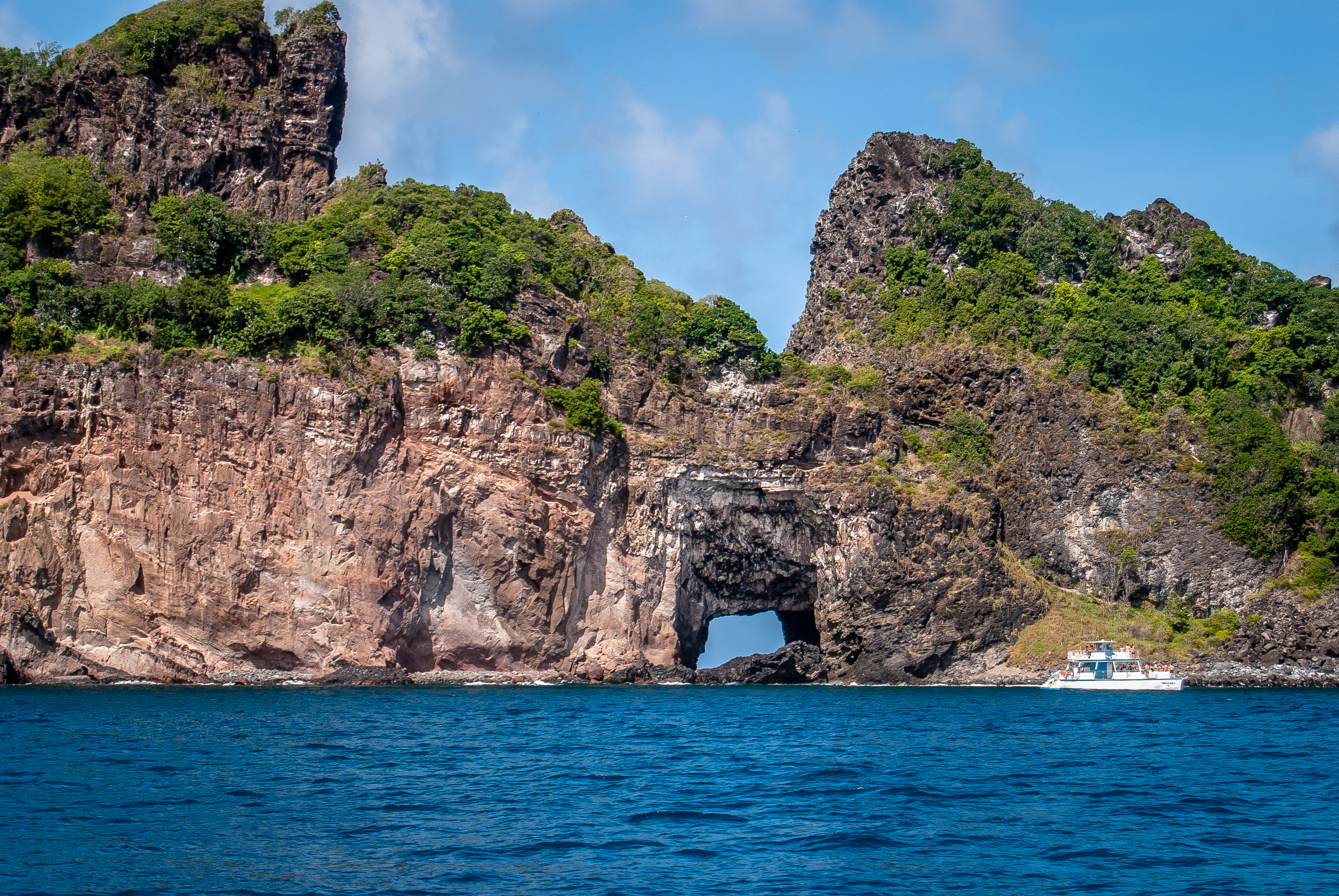
Ponta da Sapata

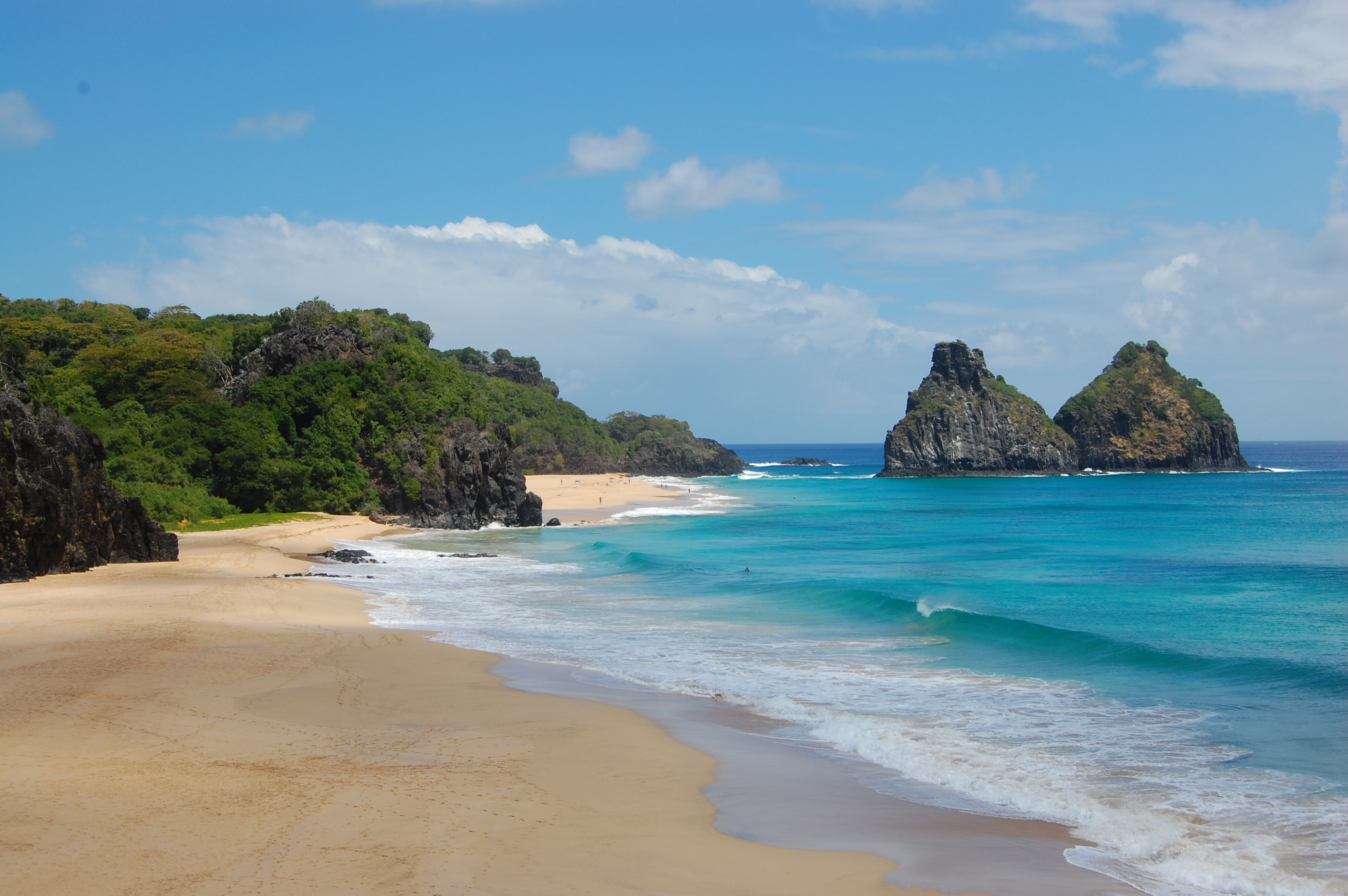
Two Brothers Rock

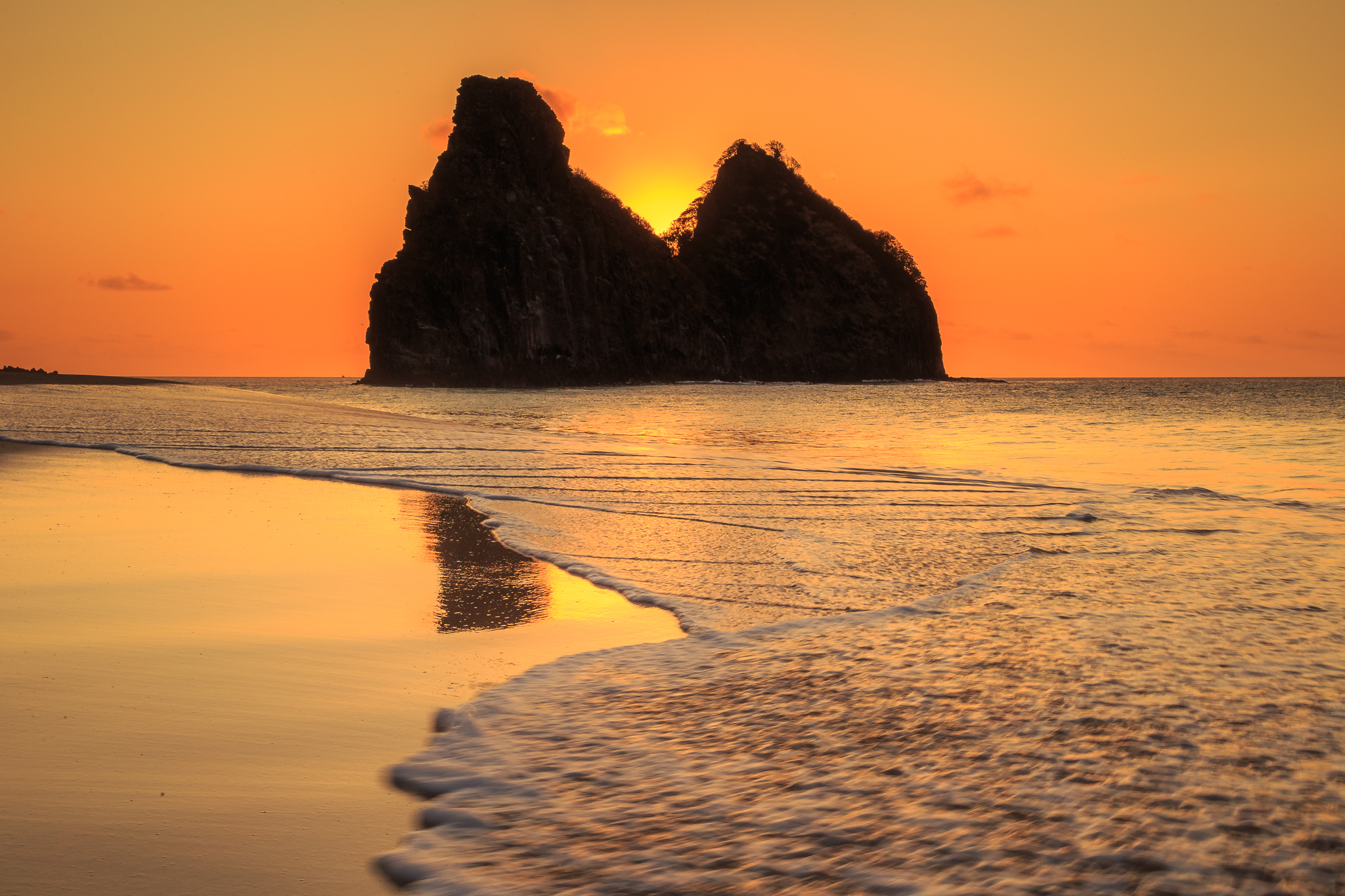
Sunset

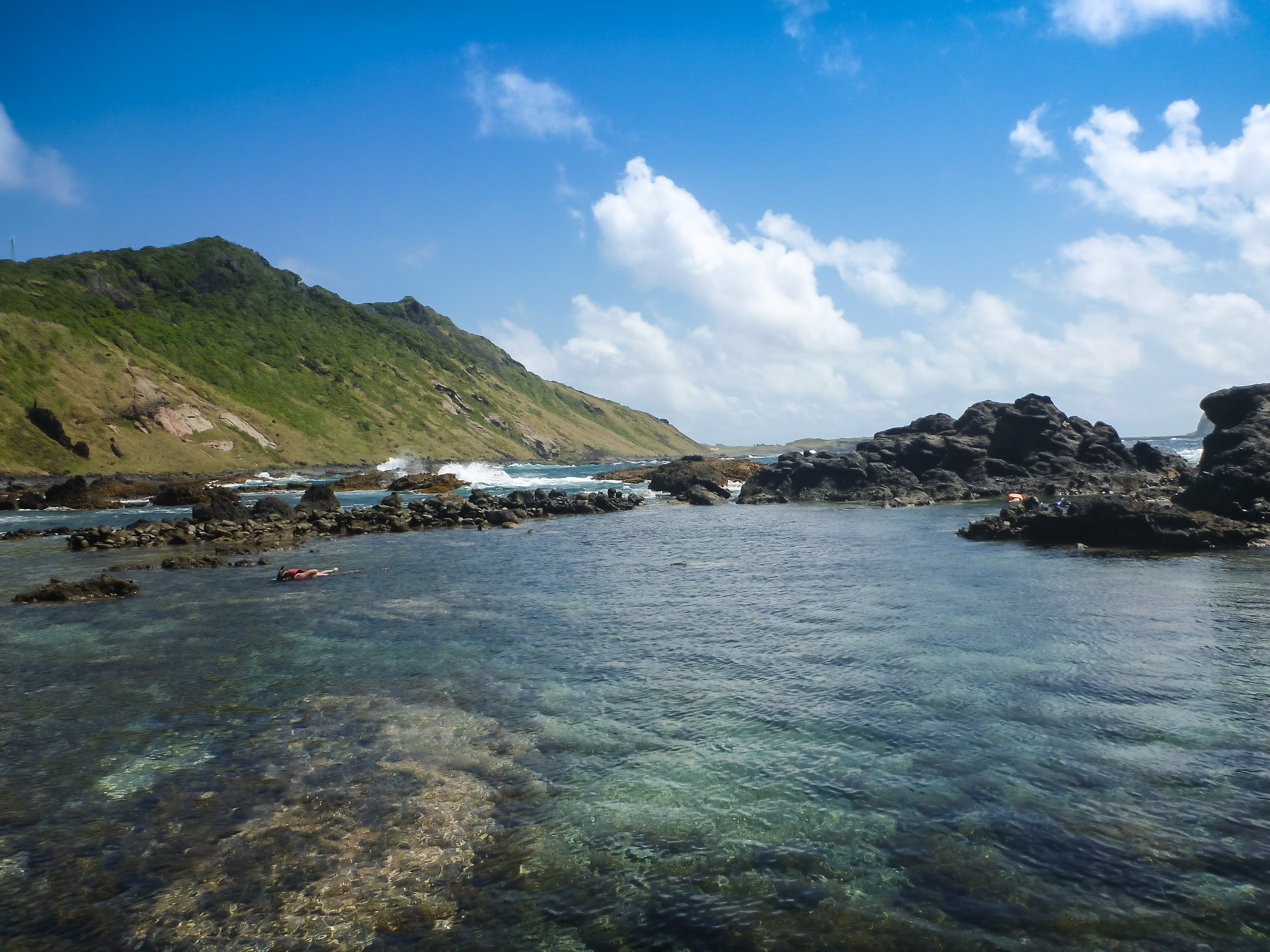
Fernando de Noronha snorkeling

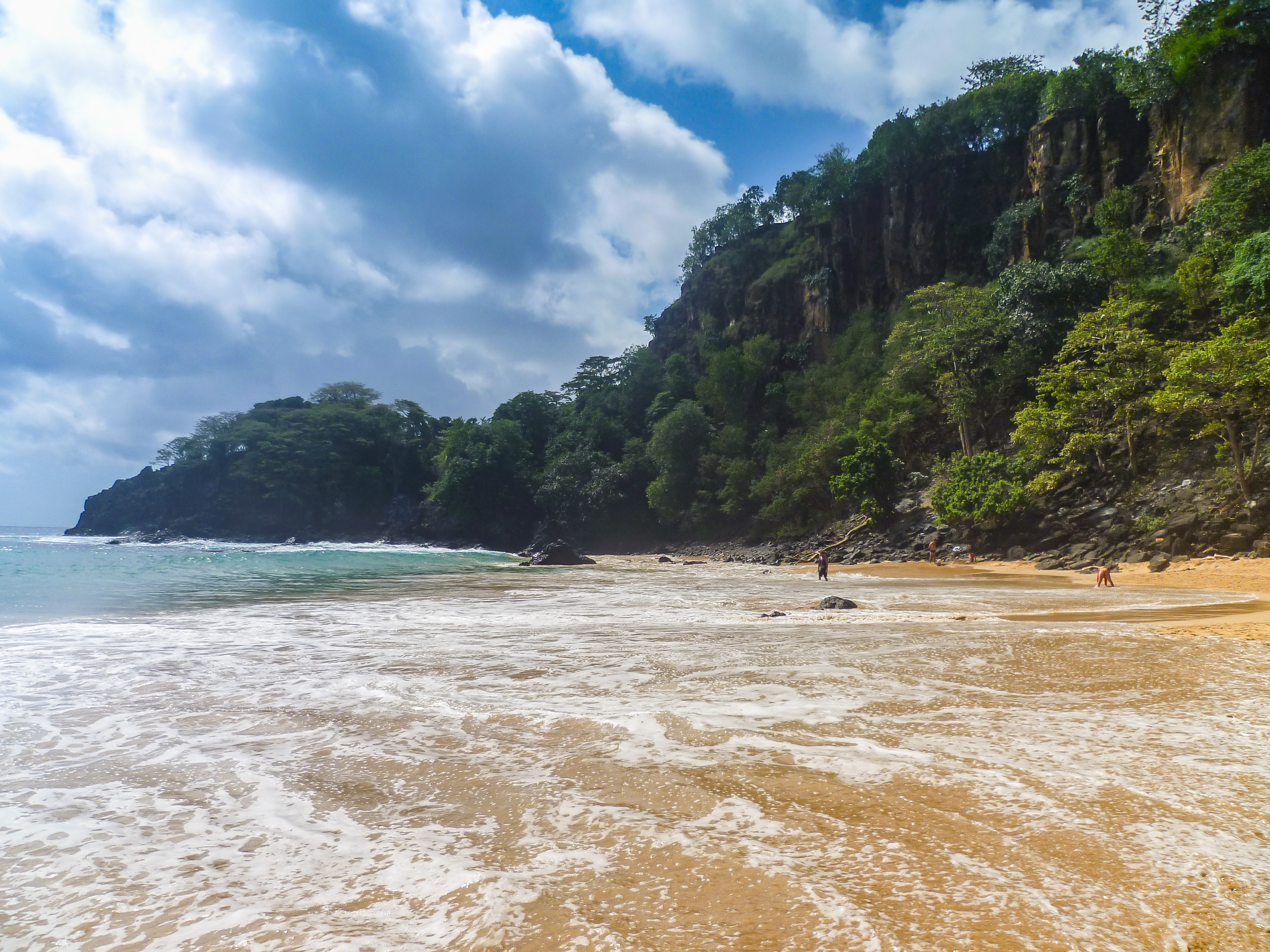
Fernando de Noronha beach Sancho Bay

== See also ==
- Noronha hotspot
- Politics of Pernambuco

== Bibliography ==
- Duarte Leite (1923) "O Mais antigo mapa do Brasil" in História da Colonização Portuguesa do Brasil, vol.2, pp. 221–81.
- Greenlee, W.B. (1945) "The Captaincy of the Second Portuguese Voyage to Brazil, 1501–1502", The Americas, Vol. 2, p. 3–13.
- Roukema, E. (1963) "Brazil in the Cantino Map", Imago Mundi, Vol. 17, p. 7–26
