= Discovery of Brazil =

Portuguese discovery in 1500

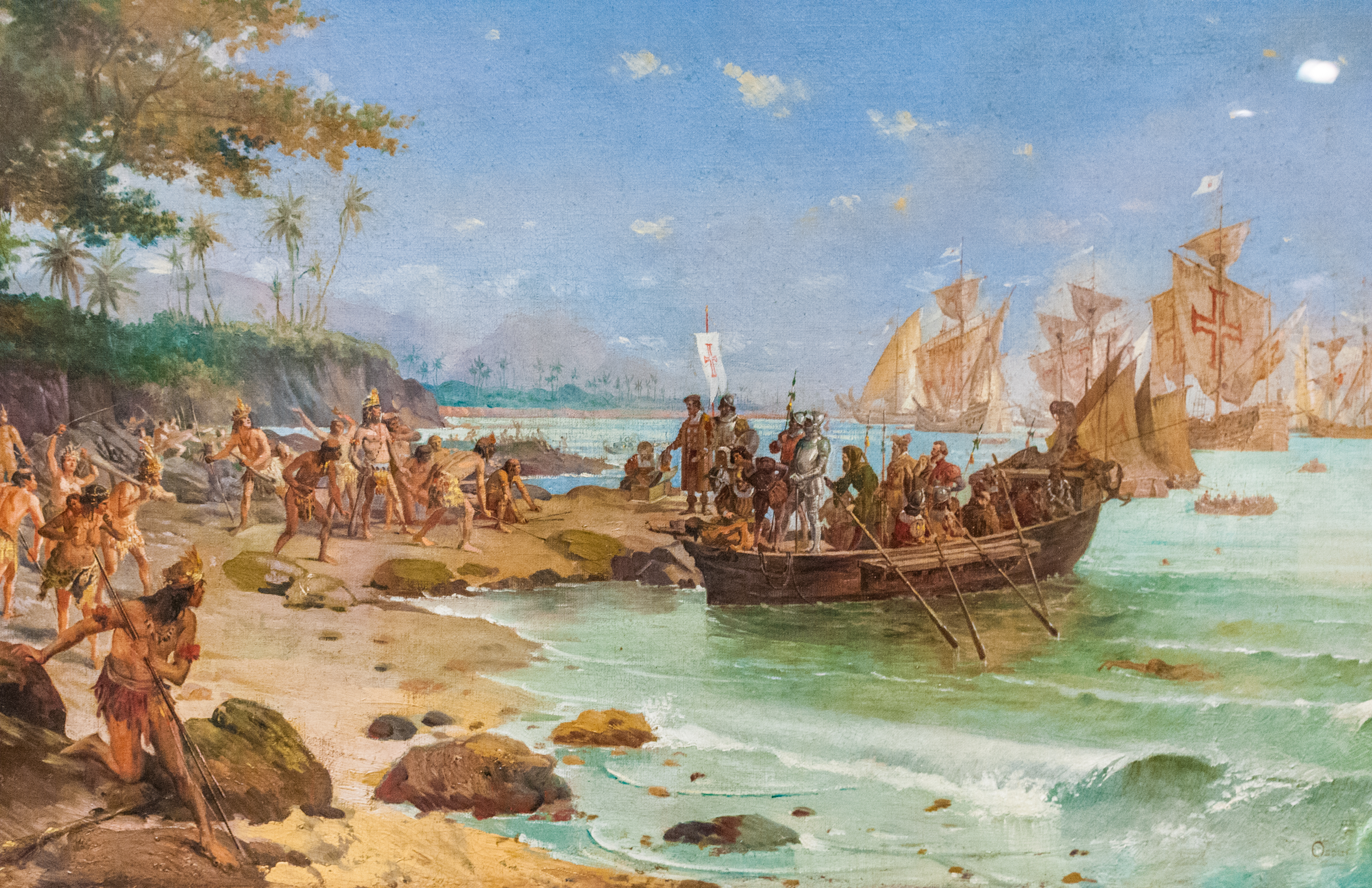
The Landing of Pedro Álvares Cabral in Porto Seguro in 1500; oil on canvas by Oscar Pereira da Silva, 1904. Collection of the National Historical Museum of Brazil

The first landing of European explorers to the territory of present-day Brazil, which was already inhabited by various Indigenous communities, is often credited to Portuguese navigator Pedro Álvares Cabral, who sighted the land later named Island of Vera Cruz, near Monte Pascoal, on 22 April 1500 while leading an expedition to Calicut, India. Cabral's voyage is part of the so-called Portuguese discoveries.

Although used almost exclusively in relation to Pedro Álvares Cabral's voyage, the term "discovery of Brazil" can also refer to the arrival of the expedition led by Spanish navigator and explorer Vicente Yáñez Pinzón, who reached the Cape of Santo Agostinho, a promontory located in the current state of Pernambuco, on 26 January 1500. This is the oldest confirmed European landing in Brazilian territory.

The use of the term "discovery" for this historical event considers the viewpoint of peoples from Europe. They recorded it in the form of written history, and the record expresses a Eurocentric conception of history. Some people in Brazil call this event the invasion of Brazil. The term "discovery" disregards the presence of Indigenous civilizations in Brazil before the arrival of the Portuguese, treating the European arrival as an act of unveiling rather than as an invasion that triggered a violent process of colonization and genocide of the original peoples. This Eurocentric view reflects the colonizers' narrative and conceals the historical reality from the perspective of Indigenous peoples; therefore, the concept of the "coloniality of knowledge" is discussed, denouncing how the historical narrative is shaped by a Eurocentric bias that silences and erases the knowledge, practices, and resistance of Indigenous peoples in the face of colonial violence.

== Discovery by Amerigo Vespucci ==
In 1499, an expedition licensed by Spain and led by Alonso de Ojeda as fleet commander and Juan de la Cosa as chief navigator set sail to explore the coast of a new landmass found by Columbus on his third voyage and in particular investigate a rich source of pearls that Columbus had reported. Vespucci and his backers financed two of the four ships in the small fleet.

The vessels left Spain on 18 May 1499 and stopped first in the Canary Islands before reaching South America somewhere near present-day Suriname or French Guiana. From there the fleet split up: Ojeda proceeded northwest toward modern Venezuela with two ships, while the other pair headed south with Vespucci aboard. The only record of the southbound journey comes from Vespucci himself. He assumed they were on the coast of Asia and hoped by heading south they would, according to the Greek geographer Ptolemy, round the unidentified "Cape of Cattigara" and reach the Indian Ocean. They passed two huge rivers (the Amazon and the Para) which poured freshwater 25 miles (40 km) out to sea. They continued south for another 40 leagues (about 240 km or 150 mi) before encountering a very strong adverse current which they could not overcome. Forced to turn around, the ships headed north, retracing their course to the original landfall. From there Vespucci continued up the South American coast to the Gulf of Paria and along the shore of what is now Venezuela. At some point they may have rejoined Ojeda but the evidence is unclear. In the late summer, they decided to head north for the Spanish colony at Hispaniola in the West Indies to resupply and repair their ships before heading home. After Hispaniola they made a brief slave raid in the Bahamas, capturing 232 natives, and then returned to Spain.

== Discovery by Vicente Yáñez Pinzón ==
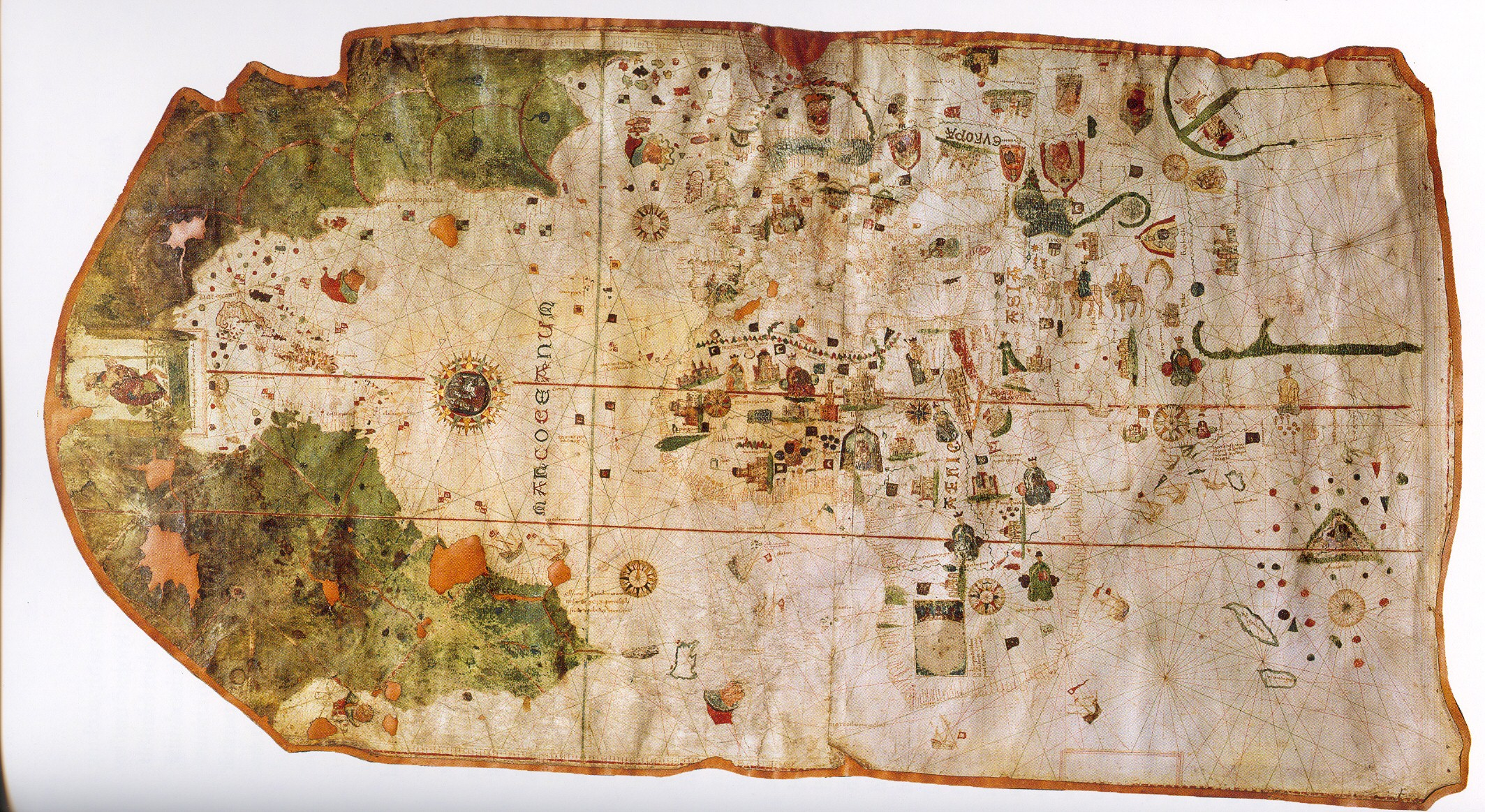
The world map by Juan de la Cosa, dated 1500, is the oldest nautical chart depicting Brazil

Many scholars assert that the real discoverer of Brazil was the Spanish navigator Vicente Yáñez Pinzón, who on 26 January 1500 landed at Cape of Santo Agostinho, on the northern coast of Pernambuco. This is considered the earliest documented European voyage to what is now Brazilian territory.

The fleet, consisting of four caravels, set sail from Palos de la Frontera on 19 November 1499. After crossing the Equator, Pinzón encountered a severe storm. On 26 January 1500, he sighted the cape and anchored his ships in a sheltered port easily accessible to small boats, with a depth of 16 feet, as indicated by sounding. The mentioned port was the cove of Suape, located on the southern slope of the promontory, which the Spanish expedition named Cape of Santa María de la Consolación. Spain did not claim the discovery, although it was meticulously recorded by Pinzón and documented by important chroniclers of the time such as Peter Martyr d'Anghiera and Bartolomé de las Casas. Spain and Portugal had signed the Treaty of Tordesillas to divide their areas of influence in the New World, and this area was to be controlled by Portugal.

During the night after the landing, the Spanish observed large fires burning in the distance, along the northwest coast. The following morning, they sailed in that direction until reaching a river, which Pinzón named "Rio Formoso". On the beach, along the riverbanks, their crew had a violent encounter with the local Indigenous people (now known to have belonged to the Potiguara tribe), an event recorded by the Spanish chronicler.

Heading north, Pinzón rounded the Cape of São Roque and reached the Amazon River in February, which he named Santa María de la Mar Dulce. From there he continued to the Guianas and then to the Caribbean Sea and across the Atlantic. He reached Spain on 30 September 1500.

Pinzón's cousin, Diego de Lepe, undertook a parallel journey, departing from Palos in 1499, twenty days after Pinzón's fleet. Lepe arrived at the Cape of Santo Agostinho in February 1500, but sailed a few miles to the south, noting that the coast slanted markedly to the southwest. From there he followed the same route to the north and the Caribbean as had Pinzón.

The map by Juan de la Cosa, a chart made in 1500 at the request of the first kings of Spain – known as the Catholic Monarchs – shows the South American coast adorned with Spanish flags from the Cape de la Vela (in present-day Colombia) to the easternmost point of the continent. The accompanying text reads, "Este cavo se descubrio en año de mily IIII X C IX por Castilla syendo descubridor vicentians" (lit. 'This cape was discovered in 1499 by Castile, with Vicente Yáñez as the discoverer'). This most likely refers to Pinzón's arrival at the Cape of Santo Agostinho in late January 1500.

The map shows that further east, and separated from the mainland, is an island marked as discovered by Portugal, and colored in blue. De la Cosa probably intended to show the land discovered by Pedro Álvares Cabral in 1500, which he named "Terra de Vera Cruz" or "de Santa Cruz". The Portuguese believed it to be an island (Island of Vera Cruz) lying in the Atlantic, separating Europe from the Indies.

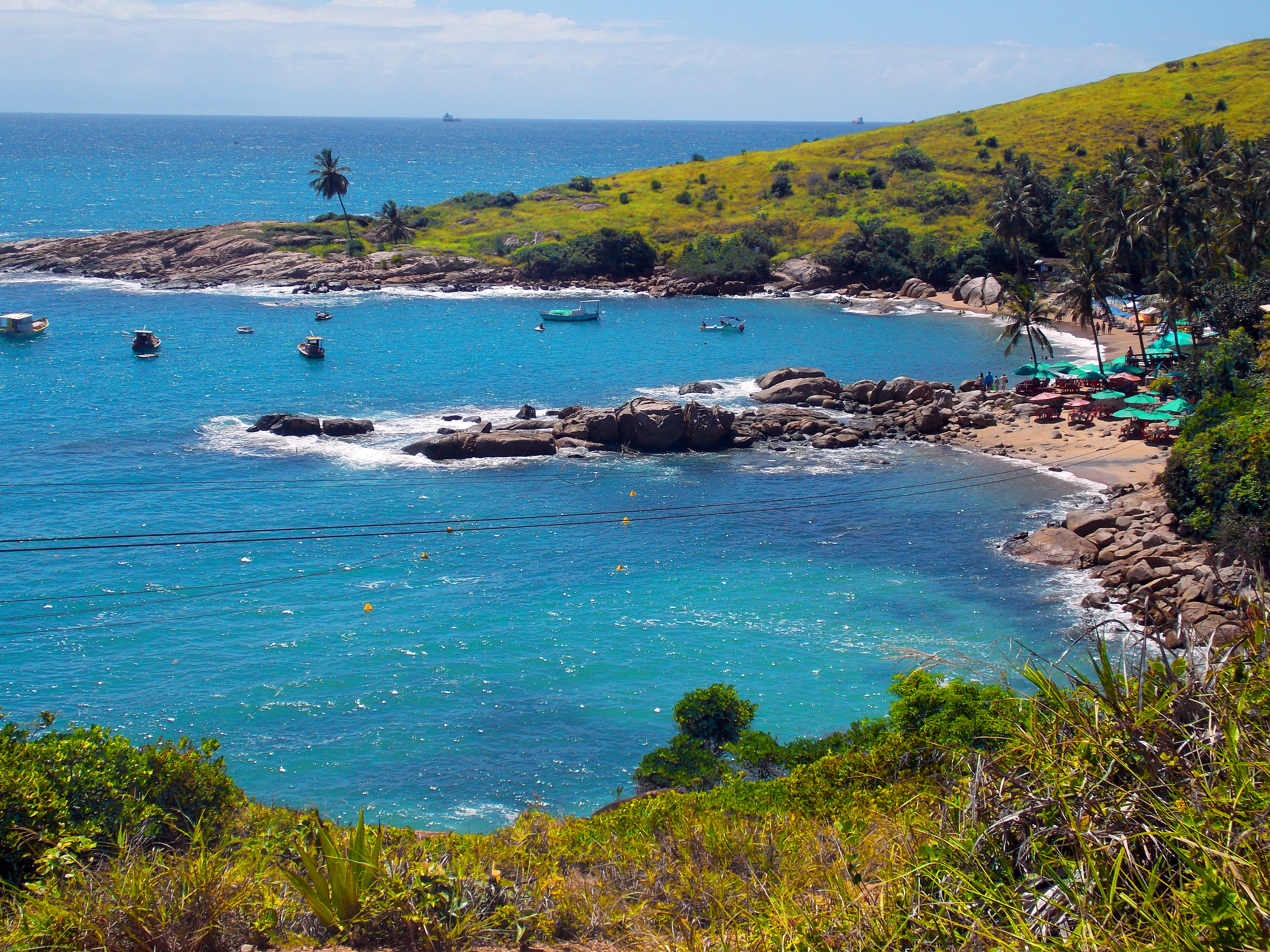
Cape of Santo Agostinho, the site of Brazil's discovery by Vicente Yáñez Pinzón

On 30 October 1500, king Manuel I of Portugal married Maria of Aragon and Castile, daughter of the Catholic Monarchs and sister of his first wife Isabella (who died during a difficult childbirth). This union initiated a deep dynastic connection between the Catholic nations of Portugal and Spain.

The following year, the first Portuguese expedition to explore the Brazilian coast departed from Lisbon, entrusted to Amerigo Vespucci and commanded by Gonçalo Coelho. On 17 August 1501, the fleet sighted the Cape of São Roque in present-day Rio Grande do Norte, already discovered by Pinzón (latitude calculations were relatively accurate at the time, although longitude was quite faulty). The Portuguese sailed southward, tracing the entire east coast of Brazil. Near Santa Cruz Cabrália, they encountered two exiles from Cabral's fleet, whom they rescued. They realized then that Cabral had not discovered an island, but a stretch of coastline of the new continent. The fleet then allegedly (Note: There are many controversial details in Amerigo Vespucci's description of this voyage.) sailed to the Cape of Santa Maria in present-day Uruguay.

Later the Spanish Crown sent navigator Juan Díaz de Solís on an expedition to explore the lands allocated to Spain according to the Treaty of Tordesillas – whose imaginary line passed along the coast of the present-day state of São Paulo, near Cananéia. For his discovery of Brazil, Vicente Yáñez Pinzón was honored by King Ferdinand II of Aragon on 5 September 1501.

== Pedro Álvares Cabral's fleet ==
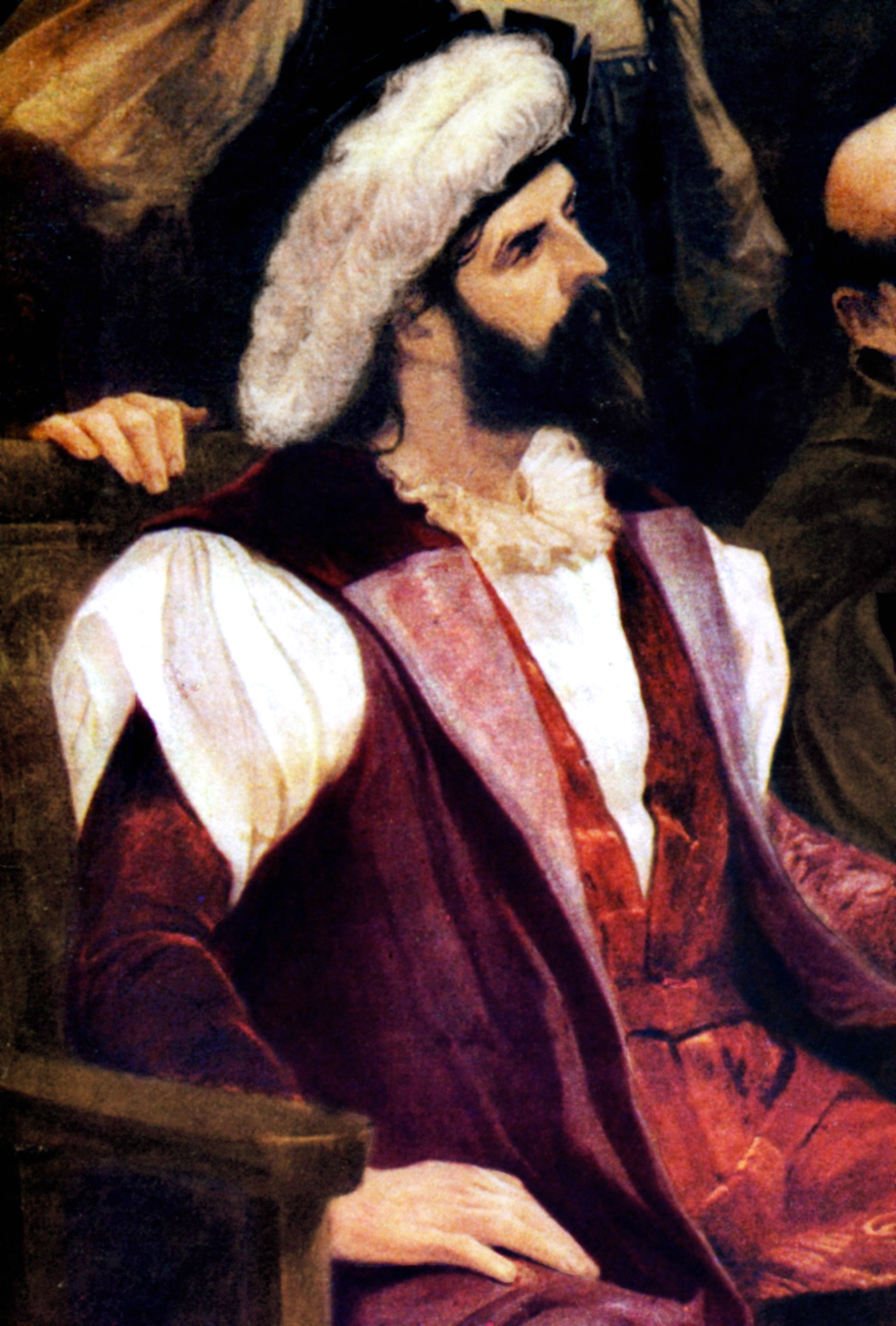
Pedro Álvares Cabral landed in Porto Seguro on the southern coast of Bahia on 22 April 1500, claiming the region as a colony of the Portugal

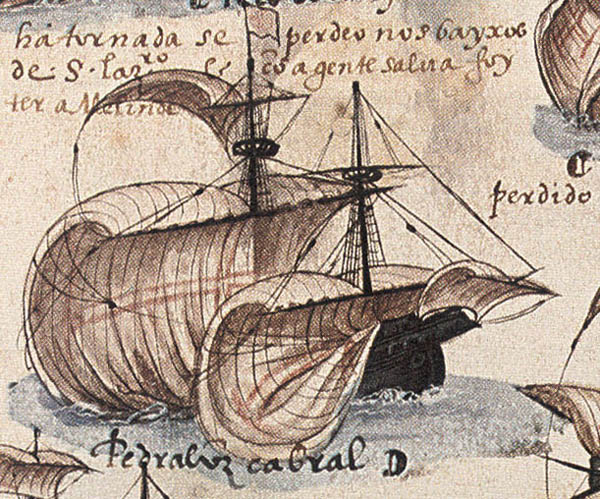
Pedro Álvares Cabral's ship as depicted in the Book of Armadas, now held in the Academy of Sciences of Lisbon

In order to seal the success of Vasco da Gama's voyage in discovering the sea route to India – which allowed bypassing the Mediterranean, then under the control of the Moors and Italian nations – King Manuel I hastened to outfit a new fleet for the Indies. Since Vasco da Gama's small fleet had struggled to establish itself and engage in trade, this would be the largest fleet assembled by the West up to that point. It comprised thirteen vessels and more than a thousand men. Except for the names of two ships and a caravel, the names of the other ships under Cabral's command are not known. It is estimated that the fleet carried provisions for about eighteen months.

This was the largest squadron ever sent to sail the Atlantic: ten ships, three caravels, and a supply ship. Although the name of the flagship is unknown, the vice-commander's ship of the fleet, Sancho de Tovar's ship, was named El-Rei. Another ship was the Anunciada, commanded by Nuno Leitão da Cunha. This ship belonged to Álvaro de Bragança, son of the Duke of Braganza, and was equipped with resources from Bartolomeo Marchionni and Girolamo Sernigi, Florentine bankers residing in Lisbon who invested in the spice trade. The bankers' letters exchanged with their Italian partners and shareholders preserved the ship's name. The caravel commanded by Pero de Ataíde, was São Pedro. The name of the other caravel, commanded by Bartolomeu Dias, is lost. The fleet was completed by a supply ship commanded by Gaspar de Lemos. It was her responsibility to return to Portugal with news of the discovery of Brazil.

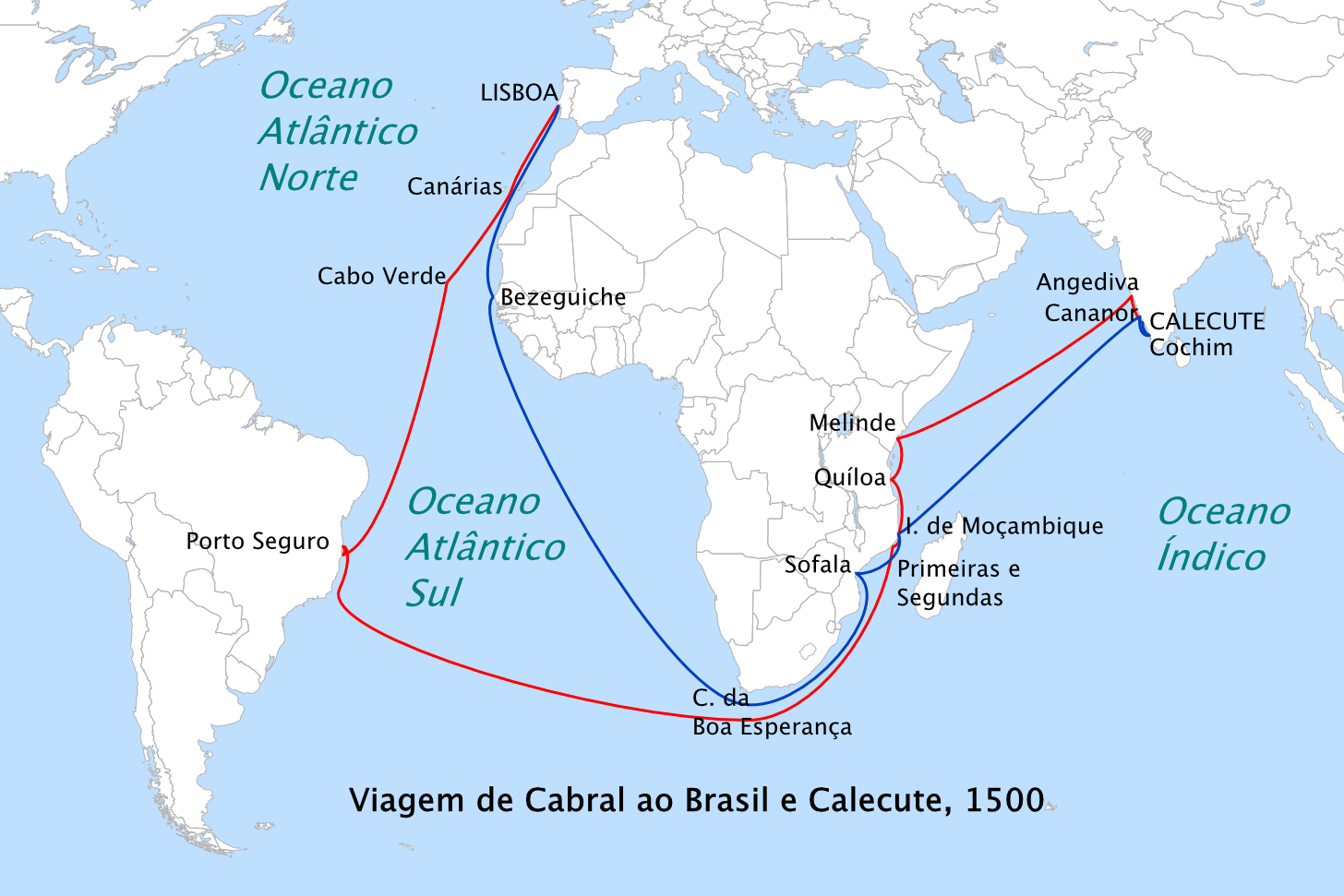
The route followed by Cabral to India in 1500 (in red) and the return route (in blue)

Based on an incomplete document found in the Torre do Tombo in Lisbon, Francisco Adolfo de Varnhagen identified five of the ten ships that made up Cabral's fleet. They were Santa Cruz, Vitória, Flor de la Mar, Espírito Santo, and Espera. Because the source cited by Varnhagen has never been found again, most historians prefer not to adopt the names he listed. The fleet remains largely anonymous.

Some 19th-century historians declared that Cabral's flagship was the legendary São Gabriel, the same ship commanded by Vasco da Gama three years earlier, when he discovered the sea route to India. But no documentation has been found to support this theory.

Shortly before the fleet's departure, the King ordered a mass to be said at the Monastery of Belém, presided over by the Bishop of Ceuta, Diogo de Ortiz. He personally blessed a flag with the arms of the Kingdom and handed it to Cabral, bidding farewell to the nobleman and the remaining captains.

Vasco da Gama reportedly made recommendations for the impending long journey: stressing coordination among the ships in order to prevent their losing sight of each other. He recommended to the captain-general to fire the cannons twice and wait for the same response from all other ships before changing course or speed (a counting method still used in terrestrial battlefields), among other similar communication codes.

=== Arrival at Vera Cruz ===
On 24 April, Cabral, accompanied by Sancho de Tovar, Simão de Miranda, Nicolau Coelho, Aires Correia, and Pero Vaz de Caminha, received a group of Indigenous people on his ship. They were described as recognizing the gold and silver displayed on the vessel – notably a gold thread and a silver candlestick. The Portuguese concluded that they were familiar with gold as a result of having much of it in their land. But in a letter, Caminha, wrote that he could not ascertain whether the natives were saying that there was gold there, or if the sailors' desire for it was so great they imagined a positive response from the natives. It was later proven that the crew had imagined a positive interpretation; the natives made no claims to gold.

Caminha also recorded in a letter the later violent encounter between Portuguese and Indigenous people on the beach. The cultural shock for each side was evident. The Indigenous people did not recognize the animals brought by the sailors, except for a parrot that the captain had with him. The sailors offered the natives food and wine which they did not recognize and rejected. They were curious about unfamiliar objects – such as Rosary beads. The Portuguese were surprised that the natives appeared to recognize precious metals. Cabral had dressed in all the attire and adornments befitting a captain, to impress the Indigenous people, and yet they passed by him without appearing to distinguish him from the other crew members.

The Indigenous people were curious about the newcomers and attended the First Mass, celebrated by Friar Henrique de Coimbra, on Sunday, 26 April 1500. The Portuguese liked to think they had introduced the natives to their faith. Shortly after the mass, Cabral's fleet set sail for the Indies, its ultimate destination. It sent one of the ships back to Portugal with Caminha's letter.

Later, when Portuguese fleets arrived with missionaries and colonists, it became obvious that they needed other methods to evangelize the Indigenous people in earnest. The Indigenous people had simply been curious about the ritual gestures and words of the Mass, with no real interest in the Catholic faith. They had their own religion.

The sighting of the land and first mass in Brazil

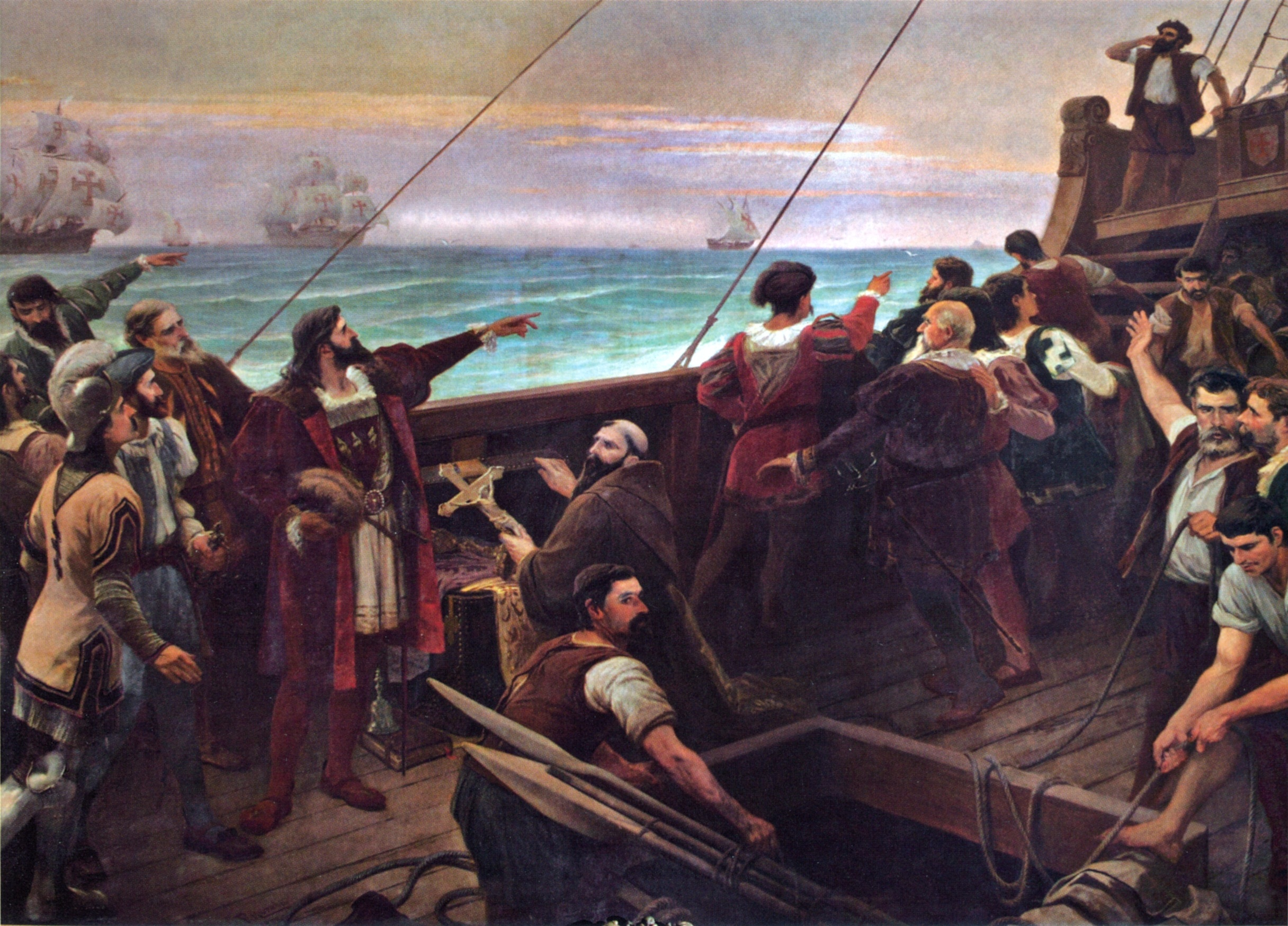
Cabral sights the Brazilian mainland for the first time on 22 April 1500, painting by Aurélio de Figueiredo, 1900

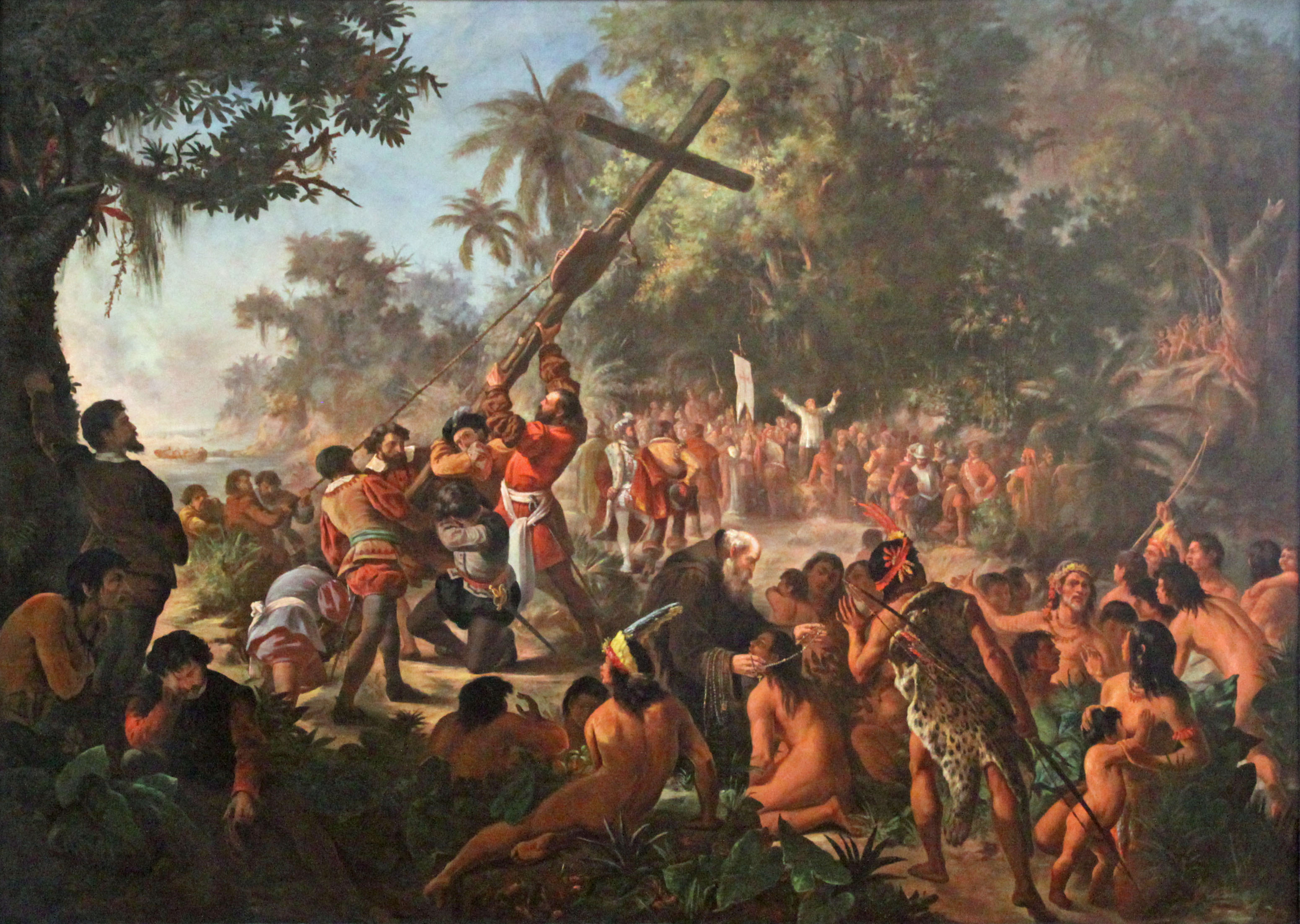
The raising of the Cross in Porto Seguro, painting by Pedro Peres, 1879

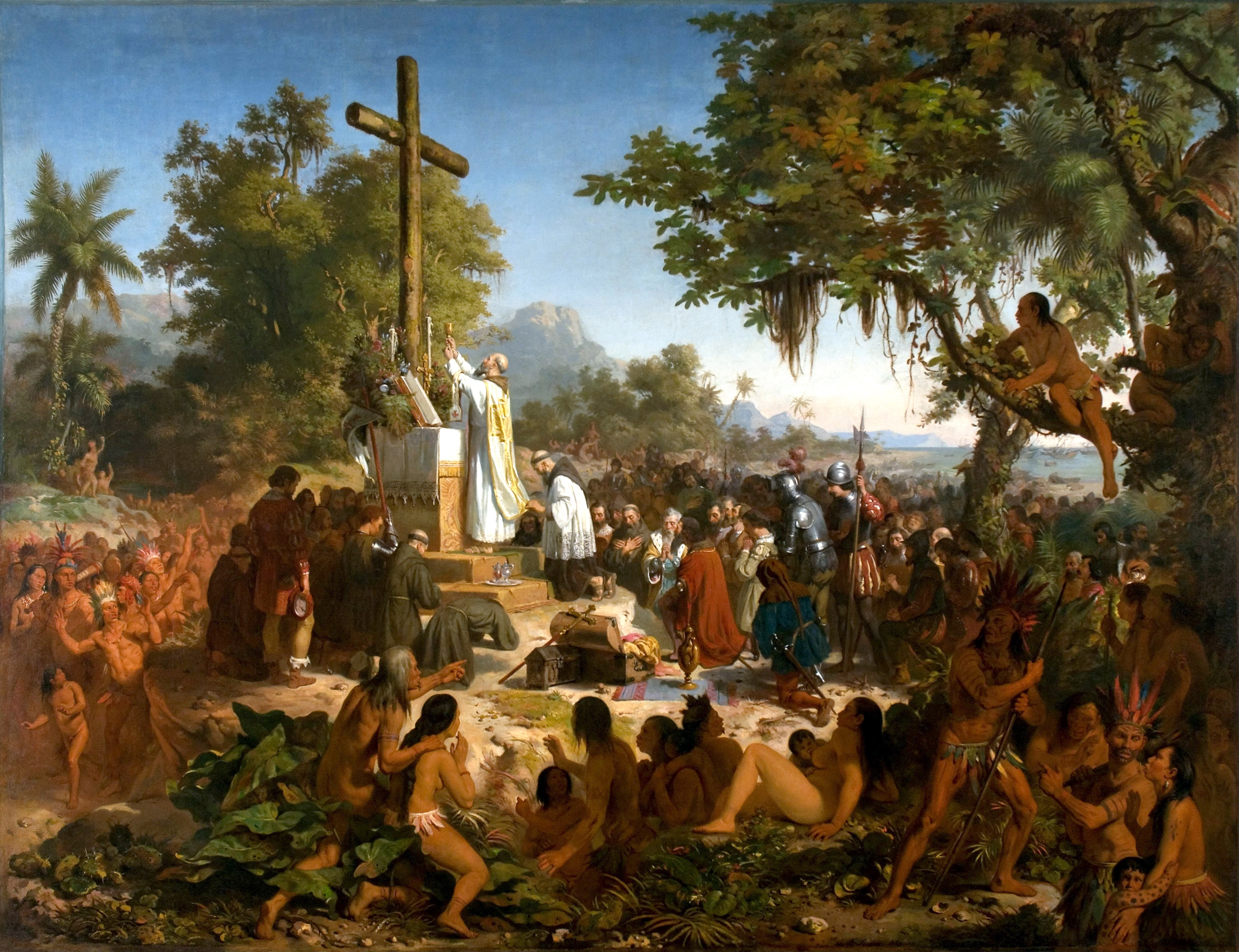
The First Mass in Brazil, painting by Victor Meirelles, 1860

== Native peoples ==
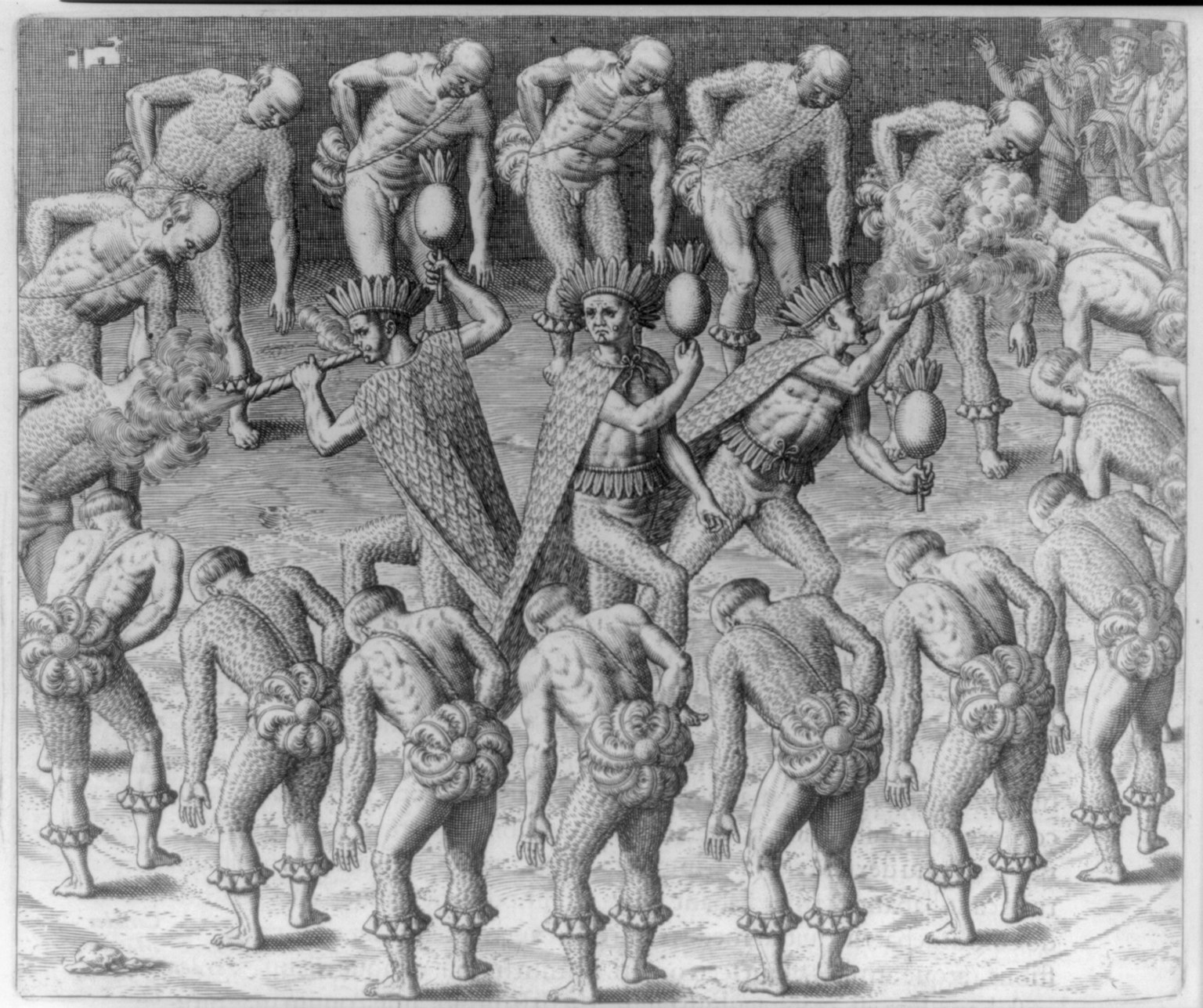
Tupinambá Indians; 16th-century engraving

On the eve of the Portuguese arrival in 1500, the coastal areas of Brazil were dominated by two major groups: the Tupi (speakers of Tupi–Guarani languages), who occupied almost the entire length of the Brazilian coast, and the Tapuia (a general term for non-Tupi groups, usually Jê-speaking peoples), who primarily resided in the interior. The Portuguese arrived at the end of a long pre-colonial conflict between the Tupis and Tapuias (especially the Tremembé people), which had led to the defeat and expulsion of the Tapuias from most coastal areas.

Although the coastal Tupi were divided into sub-tribes that were frequently hostile to each other, they were culturally and linguistically homogeneous. The fact that early Europeans encountered people along the Atlantic coast of South America who spoke closely related languages greatly facilitated communication and interaction.

Coastal Sequence c. 1500 (north to south):

1. Tupinambá (Tupi, from the Amazon delta to Maranhão)
2. Tremembé (Tapuia, coastal tribe, ranged from São Luis Island (south Maranhão) to the mouth of the Acaraú River in north Ceará; French traders cultivated an alliance with them)
3. Potiguara (Tupi, literally "shrimp-eaters"; they had a reputation as great canoeists and aggressive expansionists, inhabited a great coastal stretch from Acaraú River to Itamaracá island, covering the modern states of southern Ceará, Rio Grande do Norte and Paraíba.)
4. Tabajara (tiny Tupi tribe between Itamaracá island and Paraíba River; neighbors and frequent victims of the Potiguara)
5. Caeté (Tupi group in Pernambuco and Alagoas, ranged from Paraíba River to the São Francisco River; after killing and eating a Portuguese bishop, they were subjected to Portuguese extermination raids and the remnant pushed into the Pará interior)
6. Tupinambá again (Tupi par excellence, ranged from the São Francisco River to the Bay of All Saints, population estimated as high as 100,000; hosted Portuguese castaway Caramuru)
7. Tupiniquim (Tupi, covered the Bahian discovery coast, from around Camamu to São Mateus River; these were the first Indigenous people encountered by the Portuguese, having met the landing of captain Pedro Álvares Cabral in April 1500)
8. Aimoré (Tapuia (Jê) tribe; concentrated on a sliver of coast in modern Espírito Santo state)
9. Goitacá (Tapuia tribe; once dominated the coast from the São Mateus River (in Espírito Santo state) down to the Paraíba do Sul River (in Rio de Janeiro state); hunter-gatherers and fishermen, they were a shy people that avoided all contact with foreigners; estimated at 12,000; they had a fearsome reputation and were eventually annihilated by European colonists)
10. Temiminó (small Tupi tribe, centered on Governador Island in Guanabara Bay; frequently at war with the Tamoio around them)
11. Tamoio (Tupi, an old branch of the Tupinambá, ranged from the western edge of Guanabara Bay to Ilha Grande)
12. Tupinambá again (Tupi, indistinct from the Tamoio. Inhabited the Paulist coast, from Ilha Grande to Santos; main enemies of the Tupiniquim to their west. Numbered between six and ten thousand).
13. Tupiniquim again (Tupi, on the São Paulo coast from Santos/Bertioga down to Cananéia; aggressive expansionists, they were recent arrivals imposing themselves on the Paulist coast and the Piratininga plateau at the expense of older Tupinambá and Carijó neighbors; hosted Portuguese castaways João Ramalho ('Tamarutaca') and António Rodrigues in the early 1500s; the Tupiniquim were the first formal allies of the Portuguese colonists, helped establish the Portuguese Captaincy of São Vicente in the 1530s; sometimes called "Guaianá" in old Portuguese chronicles, a Tupi term meaning "friendly" or "allied")
14. Carijó (Guarani (Tupi) tribe, ranged from Cananeia all the way down to Lagoa dos Patos (in Rio Grande do Sul state); victims of the Tupiniquim and early European slavers; they hosted the mysterious degredado known as the 'Bachelor of Cananeia')
15. Charrúa (Tapuia (Jê) tribe in modern Uruguay coast, with an aggressive reputation against intruders; killed Juan Díaz de Solís in 1516)

The peoples who inhabited Brazil at the time of Cabral's arrival are classified as living in the Stone Age in terms of technology, transitioning from the Paleolithic to the Neolithic. They practiced an incipient form of agriculture (raising corn and cassava) and animal domestication. (They ran wild pig and capybara.) But they had developed extensive knowledge of fermented alcoholic beverage production (more than 80 types), using roots, tubers, barks, and fruits, among other material, as raw ingredients.

When the Portuguese arrived in Brazil, the coast of Bahia was occupied by two Indigenous nations that each spoke Tupi languages: the Tupinambá, who occupied the stretch between Camamu and the mouth of the São Francisco River; and the Tupiniquin, who had territory extending from Camamu to the border with the current Brazilian state of Espírito Santo. Further inland, occupying the strip parallel to that appropriated by the Tupiniquin were the Aimoré.

At the beginning of the colonization of Brazil, the Tupiniquin supported the Portuguese. Their rivals, the Tupinambá, supported the French. During the 16th and 17th centuries the French carried out various offensives against Portuguese America. The presence of the Europeans and creation of new alliances fueled the hostile tensions between the two tribes. Hans Staden, a German traveler, documented what he observed of this during period of captivity among the Tupinambá. Both tribes practiced ritual cannibalism against their rivals, as a way both to honor and acquire power of their enemies. The Europeans were outraged and appalled by the practice, persecuting natives for their culture.

== Date of discovery in Luso-Brazilian historiography ==
In historiographical terms, the date of the discovery of Brazil has varied over the centuries:

- Until 1817 – 3 May (according to Gaspar Correia)
- 1817 – 22 April (according to the letter of Pero Vaz de Caminha, which was published by Father Manuel Aires de Casal who found it among the documents brought to Brazil by the Royal Family in 1808)
- 1823 – José Bonifácio proposed the date of the opening of the Constituent Assembly (3 May) to coincide with the date of the discovery (supposedly unaware of Caminha's letter published in 1817).
- From the second half of the 19th century until 1889, the educated Brazilian citizens knew that the date of the discovery was 22 April, although it was not part of the holidays of the Empire.
- 1890 – A republican decree established 3 May as a holiday commemorating the discovery. However, the press at the time already considered 22 April as the correct date.
- 1930 – A decree by Getúlio Vargas abolished the holiday of 3 May. Since then, 22 April has been affirmed as the date.

== Theories regarding the discovery of Brazil ==
There are several assumptions and hypotheses about the discovery of Brazil. The best-known one revolves around a possible secret expedition by the Portuguese navigator Duarte Pacheco Pereira in 1498, aimed at identifying territories belonging to Portugal or Castile according to the Treaty of Tordesillas of 1494. Pereira participated in the treaty negotiations. The hypothetical journey is solely based on the explorer's account in Esmeraldo de Situ Orbis (1505), a book he authored. However, the text is ambiguous: Pacheco Pereira explicitly states that the king of Portugal "ordered the discovery of the western part", suggesting he was not speaking of his own explorations but rather of everything already explored by various navigators and known by 1505. This view is supported by the latitudes and longitudes provided, ranging from Greenland to the current southern region of Brazil. Furthermore, the possibility of a policy of secrecy by Portuguese monarchs, proposed in the first half of the 20th century by historian Damião Peres, is not sustainable, as it was common practice, in the absence of a treaty, to claim sovereignty over a land by publicizing its discovery.

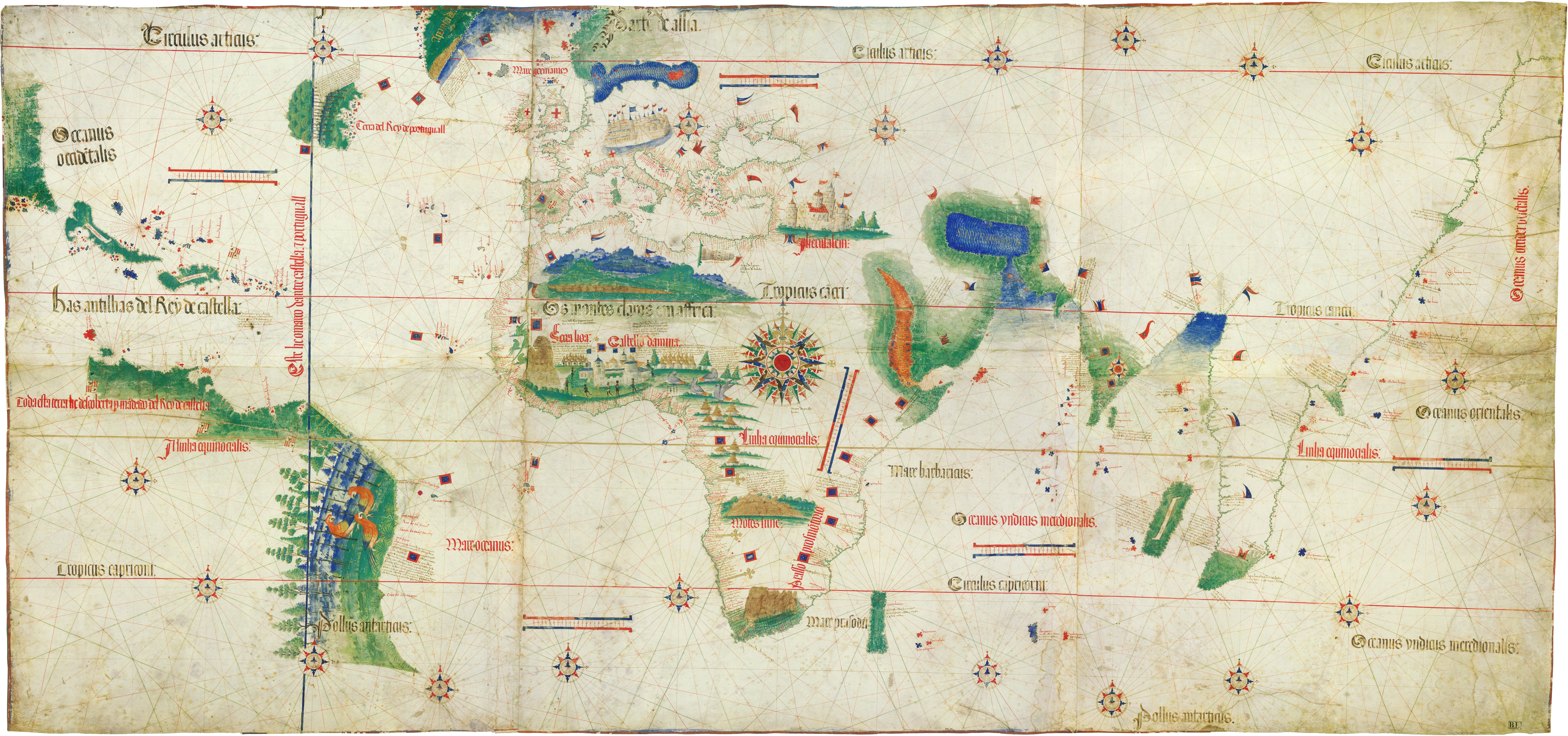
The Cantino planisphere, 1502

There is also suspicion that the Portuguese discovery of Brazil in 1500 may have been intentional, based on prior knowledge of the territory. As suggested by Pacheco Pereira in Esmeraldo de Situ Orbis, Portuguese navigators in 1498 were instructed by King Manuel I to explore the Atlantic in search of lands. Before heading to India on the 1500 expedition, Pedro Álvares Cabral would have deviated westward beyond necessity to verify the existence of territories as desired by the king. Upon sighting Brazil, Cabral believed he had discovered an island, thus invalidating the theory that he had knowledge of continental lands in those regions. The representation of the then-called Island of Vera Cruz on Juan de la Cosa's map, made the same year, refutes another theory that Portuguese discoveries were secrets not shared with the Spanish. Despite the discovery, Cabral's voyage to India was considered a failure. Cabral received an annual pension of 30 thousand reais for his deeds much less than the 400 thousand reais given to Vasco da Gama in 1498 and was forgotten by the king, dying in obscurity around 1520. His tomb was ignored for three hundred years until it was located in 1839 by historian Francisco Adolfo de Varnhagen.

There are also theories challenging the locations sighted by Vicente Yáñez Pinzón and Pedro Álvares Cabral. The first Brazilian historian to question the landing of the Spanish navigator at the Cape of Santo Agostinho was the Viscount of Porto Seguro, Francisco Varnhagen, in the mid-19th century. Although Varnhagen acknowledged that Pinzón had been in Brazil before Cabral, he believed the Cape of Santa María de la Consolación to be the tip of Mucuripe in the city of Fortaleza. The thesis was accepted by Admiral Max Justo Guedes but contested by many historians. For the Portuguese, such as Duarte Leite, the Spaniards would have landed north of Cape Orange, in present-day French Guiana. Regarding the location sighted by Pedro Álvares Cabral, there is a thesis advocating for Pico do Cabugi in Rio Grande do Norte as the mountain described by Pero Vaz Caminha, and Praia do Marco as the point of arrival of Cabral's fleet. However, according to the Cantino planisphere (1502), made the year following the exploratory expedition that rescued the two convicts left in Brazil by Cabral, the landing place of the Portuguese navigator is situated south of the Bay of All Saints.

Amerigo Vespucci is another candidate for the title of discoverer of Brazil. During his so-called "second" voyage in 1499, he supposedly temporarily separated from the leader of the expedition, Alonso de Ojeda, and explored the northern coast of Brazil, believing that he was sailing along the eastern edge of Asia. Unfortunately, the only information about this part of the voyage comes from Vespucci himself.

Some scholars may refer to the event as the invasion of Pindorama.

== See also ==
- Pre-Cabraline history of Brazil
- Age of Discovery
