= Arissana Pataxó =

Brazilian indigenous visual artist

Arissana Pataxó, born Arissana Braz (born 1983), a Brazilian visual artist and educator.

She was born in Porto Seguro and taught school for three years at a school for the Pataxó people at Coroa Vermelha. She went on to earn a degree in fine arts from the Federal University of Bahia (UFBA) in 2009. Pataxó later pursued post-graduate studies in Ethnic and African Studies at UFBA. She provided art instruction to her own Pataxó people and other indigenous peoples in the Bahia region. She now lives and works in Santa Cruz Cabrália.

She had her first solo exhibition at the Museum of Archaeology and Ethnology at UFBA in 2007. Her work has been included in exhibitions at the Regional Visual Arts Salon of Porto Seguro and the Artistic Museum of Montenegro. Her work also appeared in the travelling exhibition "Mira! Artes Visuais Contemporâneas dos Povos Indígenas" which was presented in Belo Horizonte and Brasília. She placed second in the PIPA Online competition in 2016.
