= Braga Cathedral Treasure =

Museum

Coordinates: 41.5502°N 8.4275°W

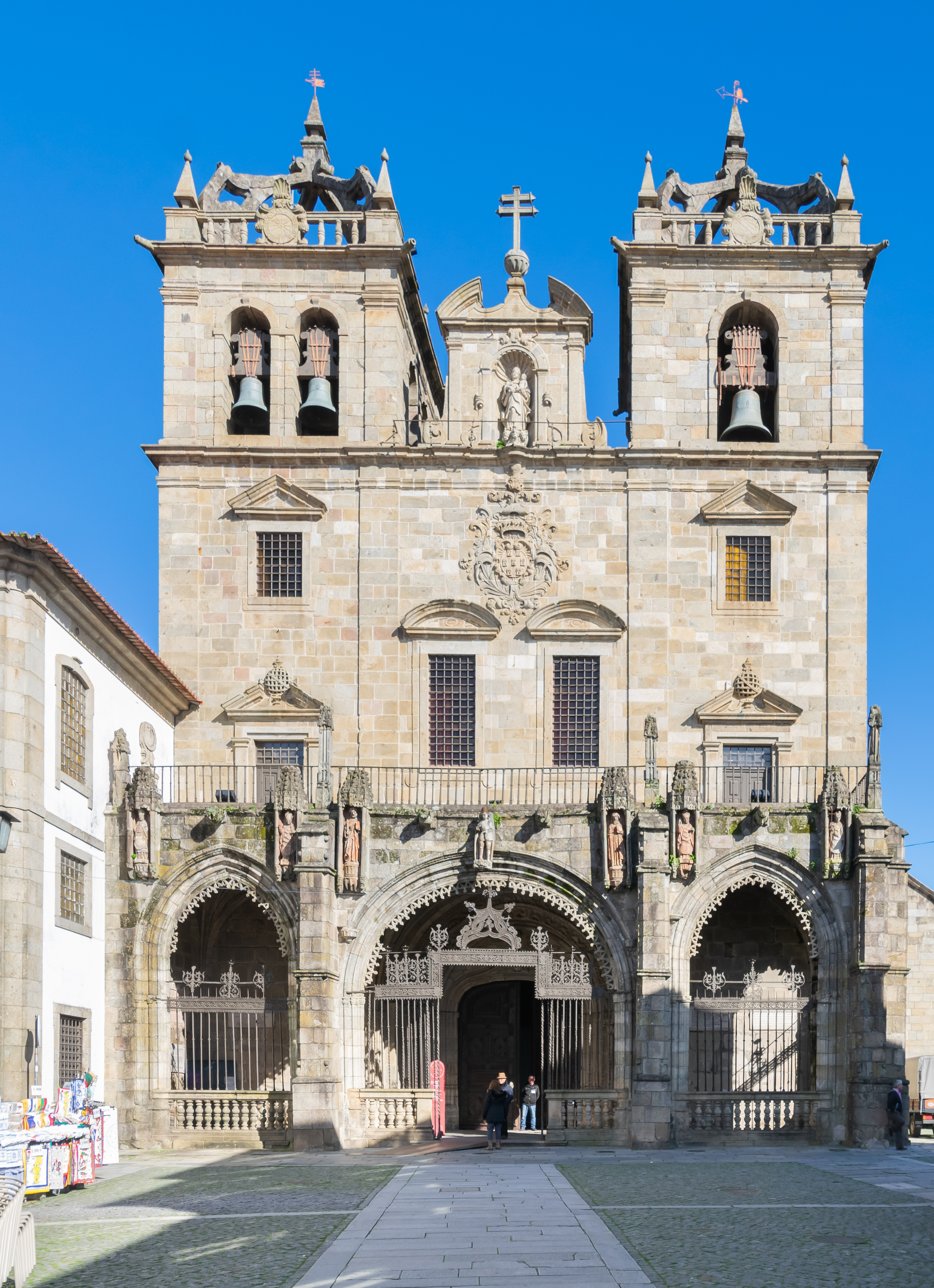

The Cathedral Treasure or Sacred Art Museum is a museum incorporated in the Braga Cathedral in Braga, Portugal.

It comprises five collections: Treasure, Carving, Statuary, Azulejos, and Bells. The collection was first developed in 1930 and reopened to the public in 2007.

== Treasure ==
The treasure contains a wealth of precious items:

- Clothing from the 16th, 17th, and 18th centuries, either Portuguese or Oriental.
- Sumptuous objects used in religious services.
- A Hispano-Arab casket of the 10th century in Ivory.
- An Iron Cross before which Frei Henrique de Coimbra celebrated the First Mass in Brazil after the arrival of Pedro Álvares Cabral.
- Numerous objects of gold, silver, and precious stones were used for services, like crosses, chalices among others.

== Carving ==
In the museum, there are different works of Wood carving like altars, musical instruments, Candelabras, among others.

The two Organs in the Cathedral are part of the museum visit.

== Statuary ==
In the museum, there is a collection of different works of sculpture from different periods in different material from the 14th to the 18th centuries. Images of Christ, Virgin Mary, and numerous Saints. In 2020, the museum acquired two sculptures, the 17th century Our Lady of Hope, and the 20th century replica of Our Lady of Milk.

== Azulejos ==
In the collection are numerous azulejos including some Hispano-Arab Tiles.

== Bells ==
The museum comprises 200 bells made in different times by the well known local bell industry.
