= Coroa Vermelha =

Cove in Bahia, Brazil

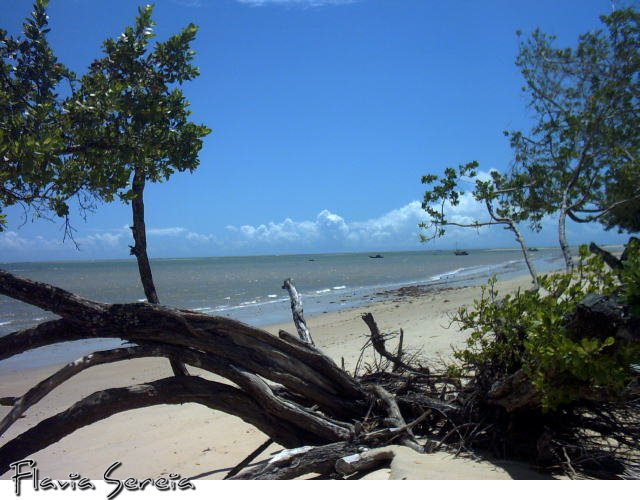
- Location: Santa Cruz Cabrália and Porto Seguro, Brazil
- Coordinates: 16.337°S 39.007°W
- Ocean/sea sources: Atlantic Ocean
- Basin countries: Brazil

Coroa Vermelha (Pataxó Hã-Ha-Hãe: Aktxurá Eoató) is a cove in the southernmost part of the state of Bahia, Brazil, located between Santa Cruz Cabrália and Porto Seguro. It is home to the Pataxó Indigenous reserve, with a village where natives sell handicrafts (seed necklaces, kitchen utensils, etc.). The homonymous beach is also found there, where the official discovery of Brazil took place on April 22, 1500, and the first mass in Brazil was celebrated by the priests of Cabral's fleet on April 26, 1500. It is named after the large orange-colored coral reef it has.
