= Tomás Torres =

Tomás Torres is the name of:

- Tomás de Torres (died 16th-century), Portuguese astrologer teacher of King John III of Portugal
- Tomás Torres Mercado (1960–2015), Mexican left-wing politician
- Tommy Torres (born 1971), Puerto Rican musician
