= Portuguese conquest of Minas Gerais =

- Part of the Portuguese colonization of the Americas
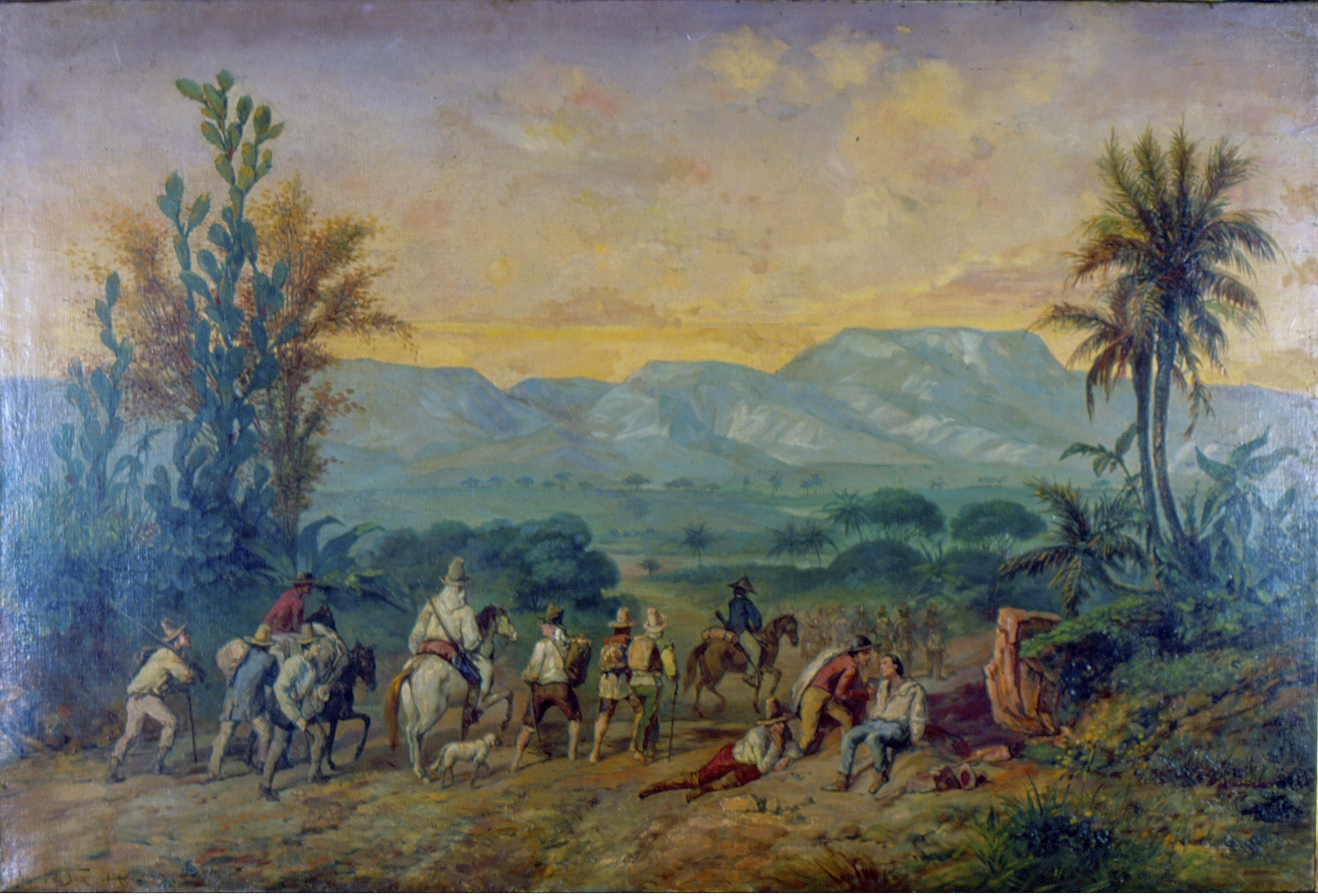
- "Bandeirantes on the Way to Minas" by Oscar Pereira da Silva, 1920
Date	18th—19th century
Location	Minas Gerais
Result	Portuguese victory

Belligerents
Portuguese Empire	Indigenous groups

The Portuguese conquest of Minas Gerais was the process by which the Portuguese established control over modern-day Minas Gerais from the 18th to 19th century.
