= First Mass in Brazil =

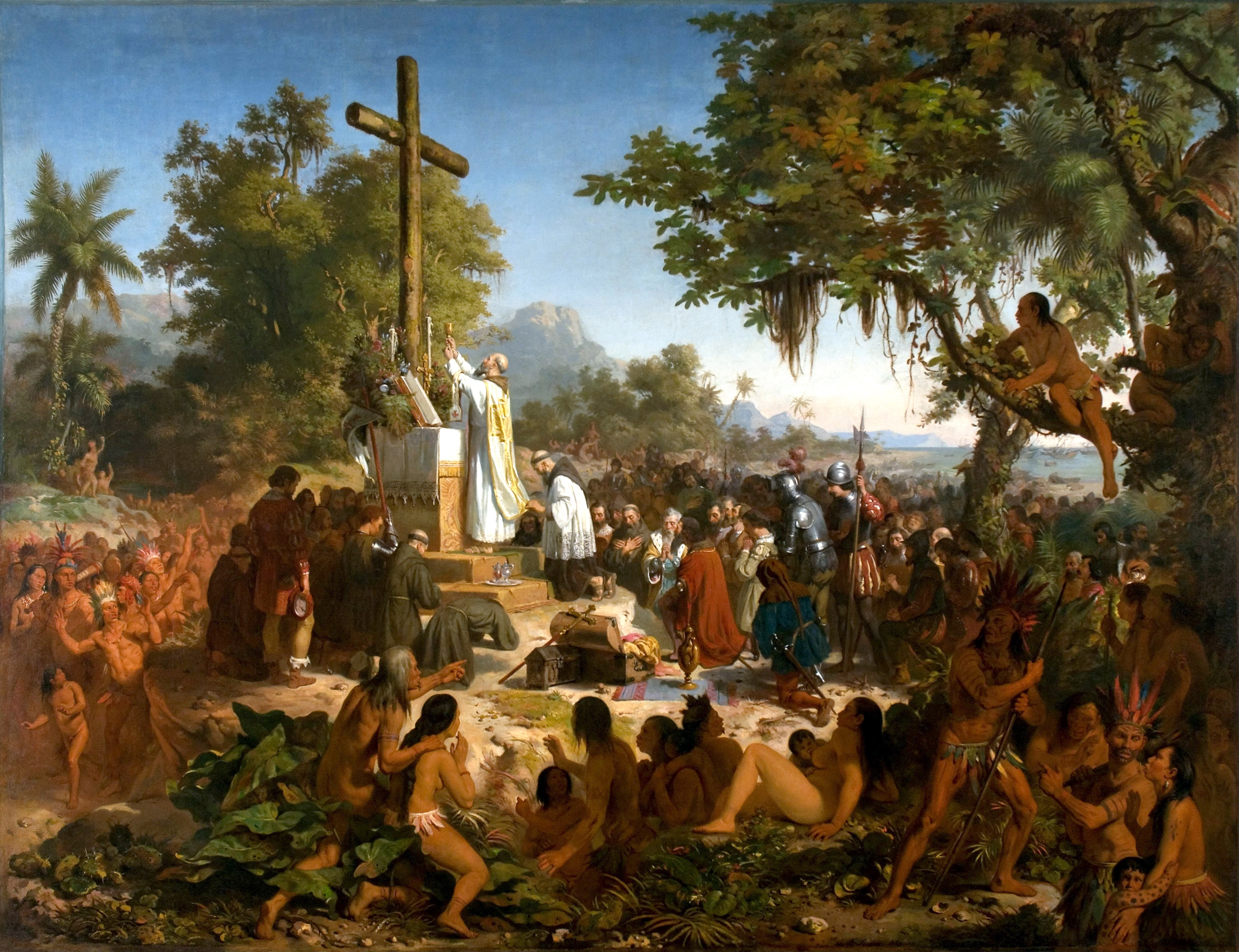
The First Mass in Brazil, painting by Victor Meirelles, 1860

The first mass in Brazil was celebrated by Portuguese friar and bishop Henrique de Coimbra on April 26, 1500 (May 6 in the current calendar), a Sunday, on the beach of Coroa Vermelha, in Santa Cruz Cabrália, on the southern coast of Bahia.

== History ==
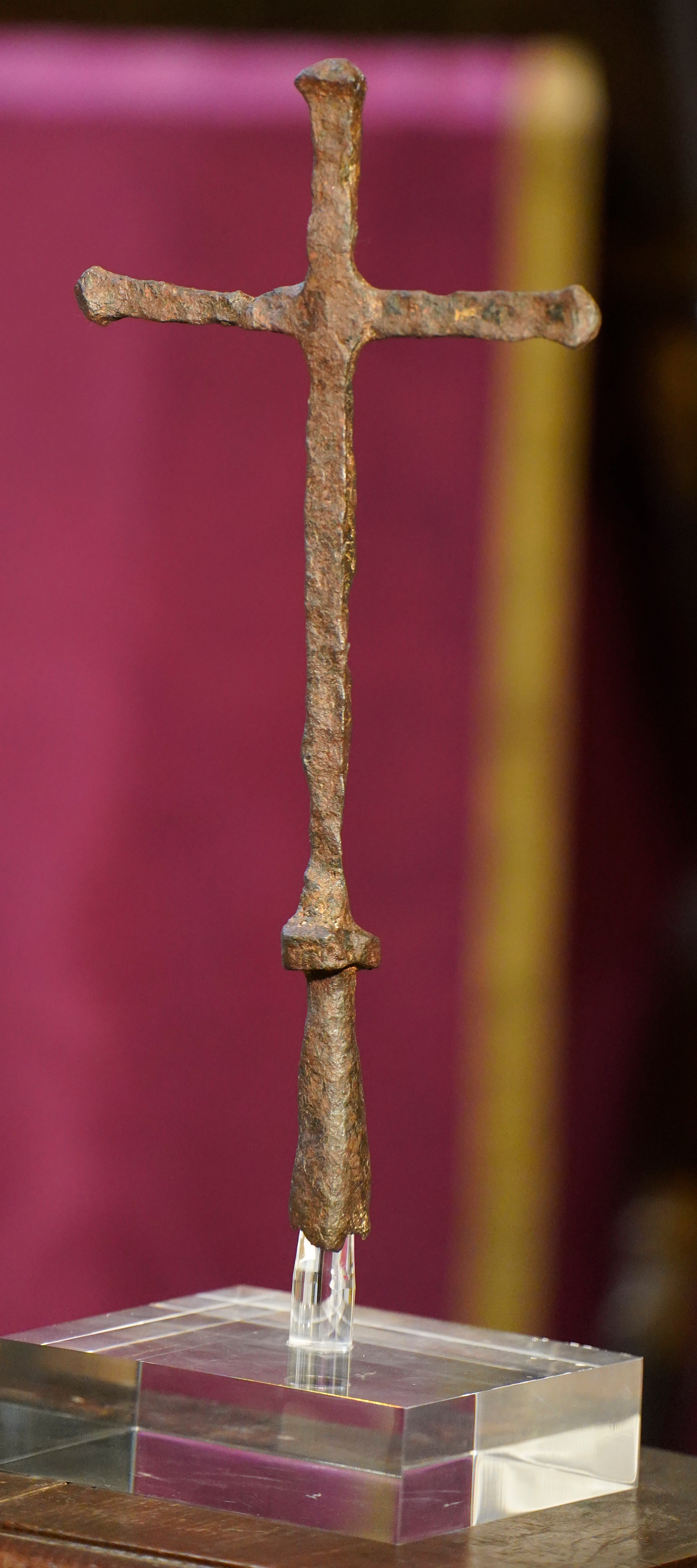
Cross from the First Mass in Brazil in the Braga Cathedral Treasure

The event was described by Pero Vaz de Caminha in a letter which he sent to the King of Portugal, Manuel I (1469–1521), informing him about the arrival in Brazil, then called Ilha de Vera Cruz (Island of the True Cross), by the fleet of Pedro Álvares Cabral that was heading to India.

Those who participated in the mass were the Portuguese members of the expedition, mostly sailors. Cabral and Caminha were also present. Pero Vaz de Caminha made this interesting account:

On Easter Sunday morning, the Captain decided to attend Mass and preaching on that islet. He ordered all the captains to prepare in the boats and go with him. And so it was done. He ordered a portable altar to be set up on that islet, and inside it, a well-prepared altar. And there, with all of us, he had Mass celebrated, which was said by Father Henrique in a sung voice, and officiated with the same voice by the other priests and clergymen who were all there. According to my opinion, this Mass was heard by everyone with great pleasure and devotion.

With the Captain was the banner of Christ, with which he left Belém, and it was always raised on the side of the Gospel.

After the Mass, the priest undressed and climbed onto a high chair, and all of us threw ourselves on that sand. And he delivered a solemn and profitable sermon on the story of the Gospel, at the end of which he spoke about our coming and the discovery of this land, conforming to the sign of the Cross, under whose obedience we came, which was very fitting and caused much devotion.

While we were at Mass and the sermon, there would be on the beach about as many people as there were yesterday, with their bows and arrows, enjoying themselves. And looking at us, they sat down. And after the Mass was over, while we were seated at the sermon, many of them stood up, blew horns or trumpets, and started to jump and dance for a while.

Some indigenous people peacefully accompanied the Catholic mass, seeming to imitate the movements made by the Portuguese, such as sitting down. This fact led Caminha to conclude that the future conversion of the natives to Catholicism would be an easy and peaceful mission.

In the following days, the Portuguese tried to demonstrate to the indigenous people the respect they had for the cross, kneeling one by one and kissing it. Some indigenous people made the same gesture, which led them to be considered innocent and easy to evangelize. Vaz de Caminha also requested the prompt arrival of a clergyman from the King to baptize them in order to learn more about their faith.

Who knows if these childlike visitors will keep such a profound impression of what they observed there, that one day they will be attracted by it to become part of our national community?

— Victor Meirelles, apud Peixoto, 1982: 109

== Legacy ==
The day is still celebrated as a holiday in Portugal, in the municipality of Belmonte, Cabral's hometown.

The cross used in the mass is displayed in the Treasury-Museum of the Braga Cathedral, having been used in the inaugural mass of the city of Brasília.

== Victor Meirelles' painting ==
In the 19th century, the event was portrayed in the painting The First Mass in Brazil, one of the main works of the artist Victor Meirelles. The painting, dated 1860, was inspired by Pero Vaz de Caminha's Letter, written over three centuries earlier.

The painting was classified and exhibited at the Salon of the École des Beaux-Arts in 1861.
