= Henrique de Coimbra =

Portuguese catholic friar

Henrique Soares de Coimbra
- Bishop of Ceuta
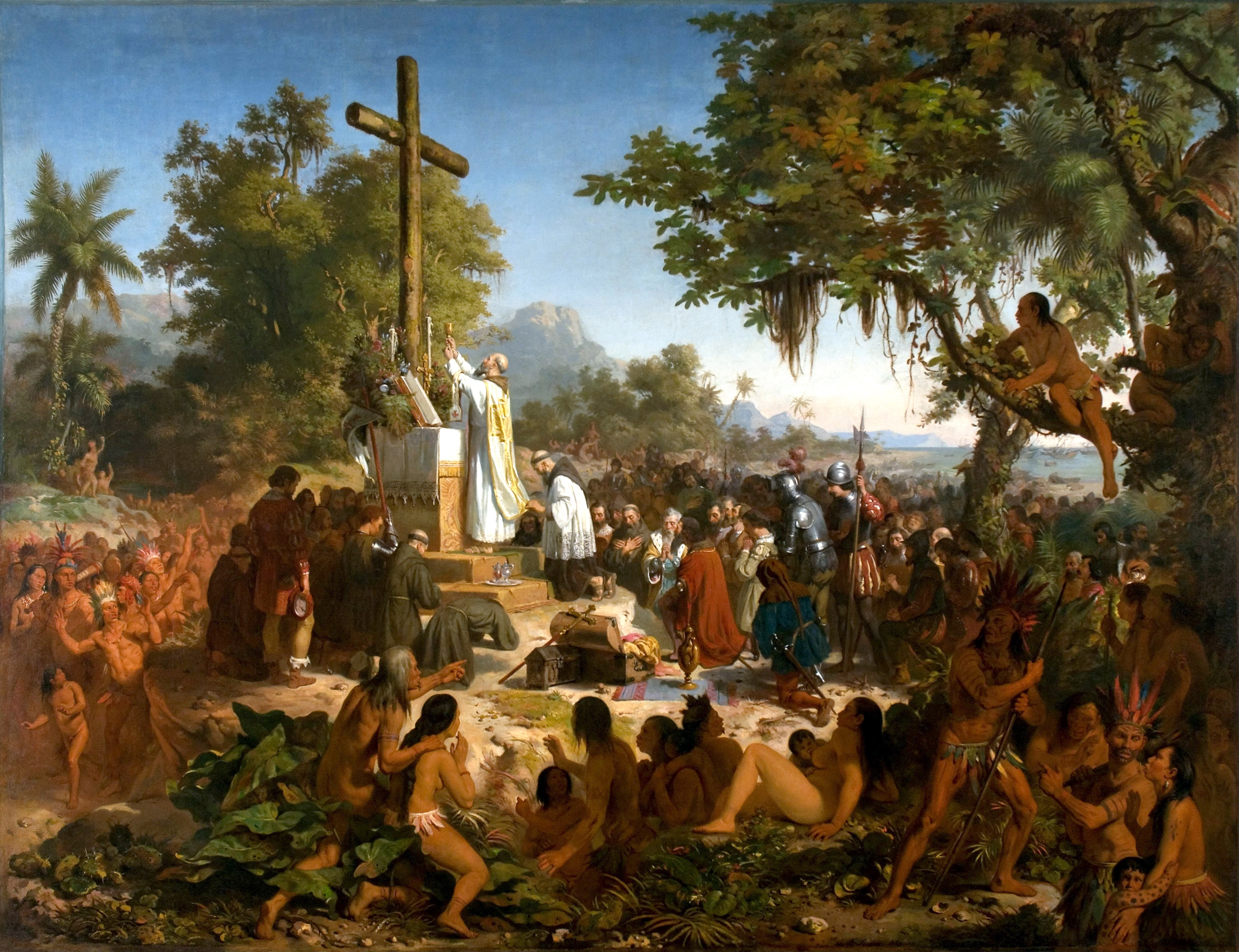
- Detail from A Primeira Missa no Brasil by Victor Meirelles (1861)
- Church: Diocese of Ceuta
- Appointed: 30 January 1506
- Installed: 1506
- Term ended: 1532
- Predecessor: Dom Diogo Ortiz de Vilhegas
- Successor: Dom Diogo da Silva O.F.M.

Personal details
- Born: c. 1465 Coimbra
- Died: 14 September 1532 (aged 66–67) Olivença
- Coat of arms

Henrique Soares de Coimbra O.F.M. (c. 1465 – 14 September 1532) was a Portuguese friar and bishop. He was a renowned missionary in India and Africa and traveled with the fleet of Pedro Álvares Cabral in 1500. In Brazil, he is known for celebrating the first mass in the country on 26 April 1500.

== Biography ==
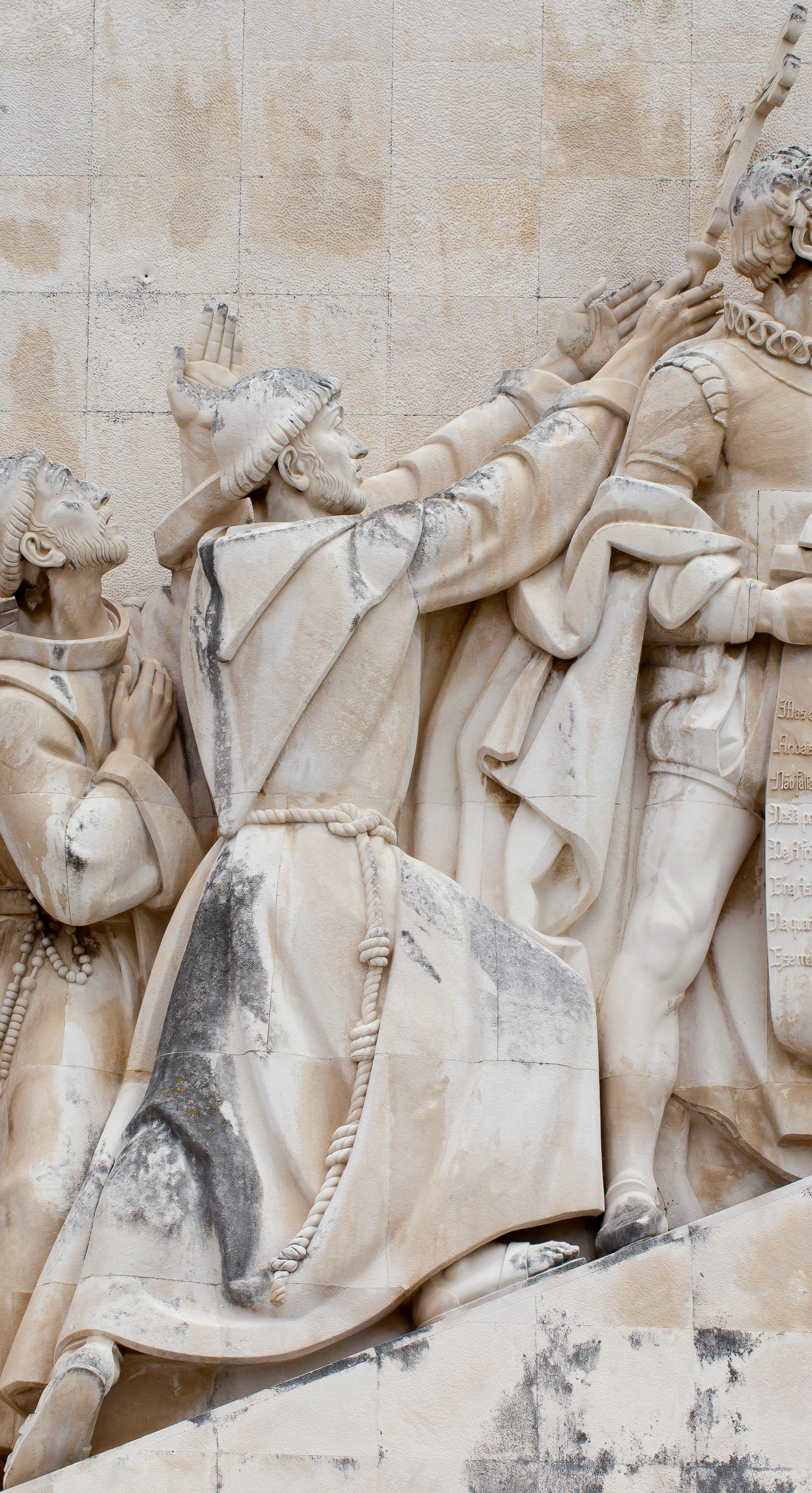
Effigy of Frei Henrique de Coimbra on the Padrão dos Descobrimentos, in Lisbon, Portugal.

D. Frei Henrique de Coimbra was a confessor of D. John II and of the Convent of Jesus (Setúbal). He was an observant in Alenquer, at the first Franciscan Convent in Portugal. In Pedro Álvares Cabral's expedition, Henrique de Coimbra led a group of religious men destined for missions in the East. In Calicut, after the discovery of Brazil and the voyage to India, five out of the eight religious men were killed in a clash with Muslims following the betrayal of the Samorim. Due to the mission's failure, Henrique de Coimbra returned to Portugal.

D. Manuel I then chose him as the Bishop of Ceuta, Primate of Africa, and Apostolic Administrator of Valença, confirmed by Pope Julius II on 30 January 1506.

In 1512, he reached an agreement with the Archbishop of Braga, D. Diogo de Sousa, which led to the inclusion of Olivença in the territory of the Diocese of Ceuta. It was in Olivença that he established the seat of his bishopric. In this location, Henrique de Coimbra built the episcopal palace, the court, and the jail, as well as the Church of Santa Maria Madalena, which served as the cathedral and is "one of the noblest and purest examples of Manueline architecture" (Reinaldo dos Santos, O Manuelino). It was in this temple that the mortal remains of Henrique de Coimbra were kept.

His coat of arms, as seen in the Book of the Portuguese Armorial-Mor from 1509, was: purple, a passant silver lamb with a cord of Saint Francis of the same color, placed in an orle, which appears to be a modification of his own surname's coat of arms, certainly for religious reasons.

== See also ==
- Pero Vaz de Caminha

Preceded by Dom Diogo Ortiz de Vilhegas	Bishop of Ceuta; 1506 — 1532	Succeeded by Dom Diogo da Silva O.F.M.
