= Diogo Ortiz de Vilhegas =

Spanish priest in Portugal (1457–1519)

Don Diogo Ortiz de Vilhegas, in Spanish Diego Ortiz de Calzadilla or Villegas (died 1519), was a Castilian priest, theologian and astronomer at the service of the Portuguese monarchs.

Ortiz was born in Calzadilla around 1457. He came to Portugal in 1476, accompanying Castilian Princess Joanna La Beltraneja. He became an adviser to King John II of Portugal and later Manuel I, being successively appointed Bishop of Tanger (1491–1500), Bishop of Ceuta (1500–1504) and Bishop of Viseu (1505–1519). During his rule, he led a comprehensive artistic remodelling of Viseu Cathedral.

Ortiz advised the Portuguese kings on matters related to astronomy and navigation during the Age of Discovery. Manuel I named him tutor of his heir, future John III of Portugal.

Ortiz taught on the writings of Cato, Terence, Virgil, Sallust and some parts of the Bible, the theory of the planets and some elementary matters about astrology he heard from Tomás de Torres, an eminent doctor and astrologer of that time.

Ortiz died in Almeirim in Portugal in 1519.
