= Church of Santa Maria Madalena (Olivença) =

Temple in Extremadura, Spain

Coordinates: 38.6862°N 7.1004°W

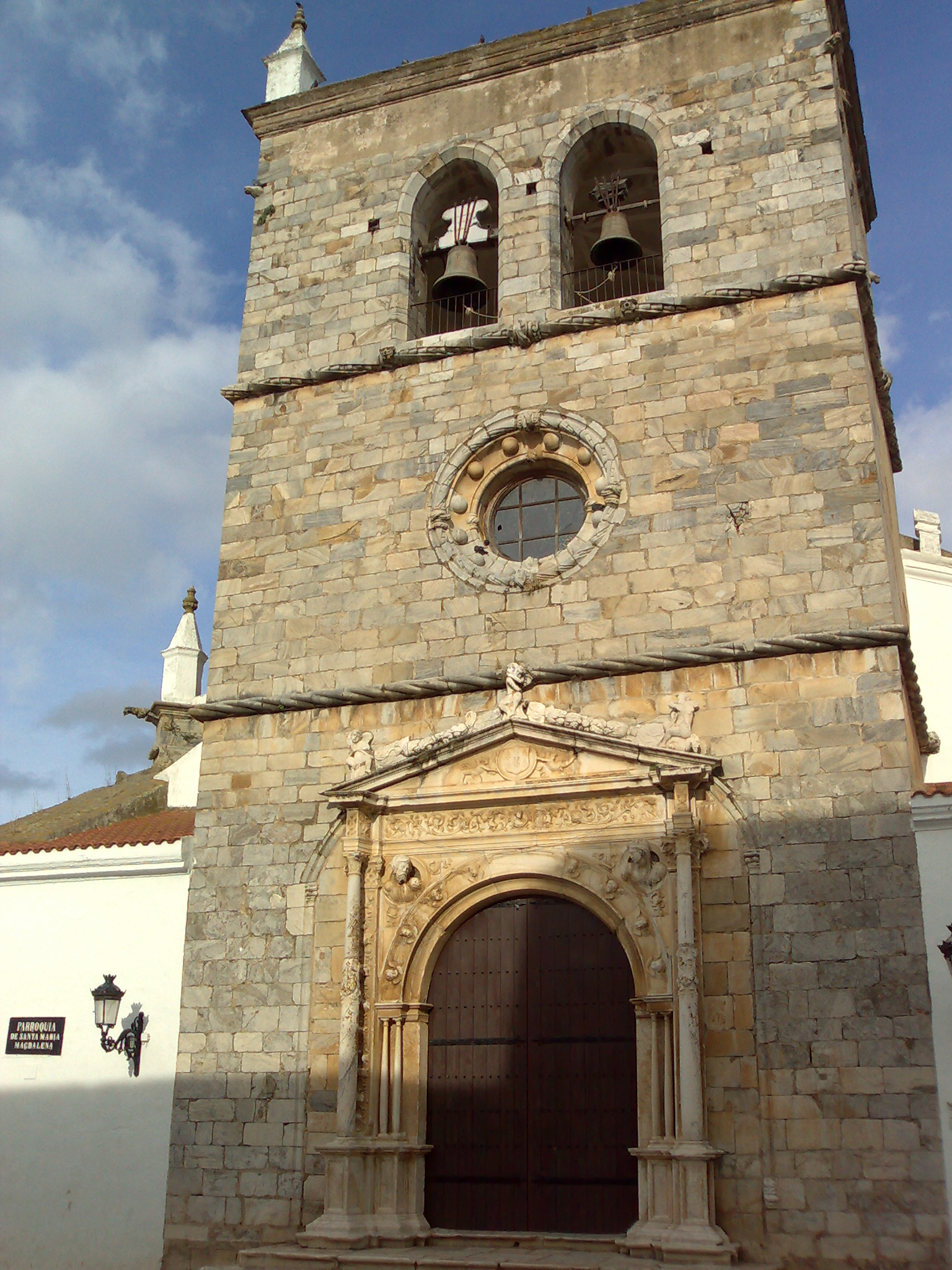
Church of Santa Maria Madalena

Church of Santa Maria Madalena is a temple located in Olivenza, Spain. It was commissioned by King Manuel I in the 16th century, giving its name to the parish and the civil parish. Its construction was driven by Friar Henrique de Coimbra, Bishop of Ceuta, who celebrated the first mass in Brazil and is buried inside the church. It was partly inspired by the Convent of Jesus and the Elvas Cathedral. It became the seat of the Bishopric of Ceuta after Olivenza was included in the territory of this bishopric.

== Details ==
It is an example of the Manueline style. The main door was added later during the Renaissance period. The interior features twisted columns, resembling the rigging of a ship, as well as six Baroque altarpieces adorned with azulejo tiles. On the exterior, one can also observe the so-called false machicolations, gargoyles, and pinnacles, among other architectural elements.

In the early 18th century, it housed a hospital and a Franciscan convent, accommodating 25 religious persons. The quality of its water, captured in the so-called São Francisco well, was highly praised at the time, with pilgrims claiming it was the best in the Kingdom of Portugal.

== The Best Corner of Spain 2012 ==
In 2012, the monument won the competition "The Best Corner of Spain 2012", promoted by the oil company Repsol, which elects the best and most picturesque Spanish corners.

== Gallery ==
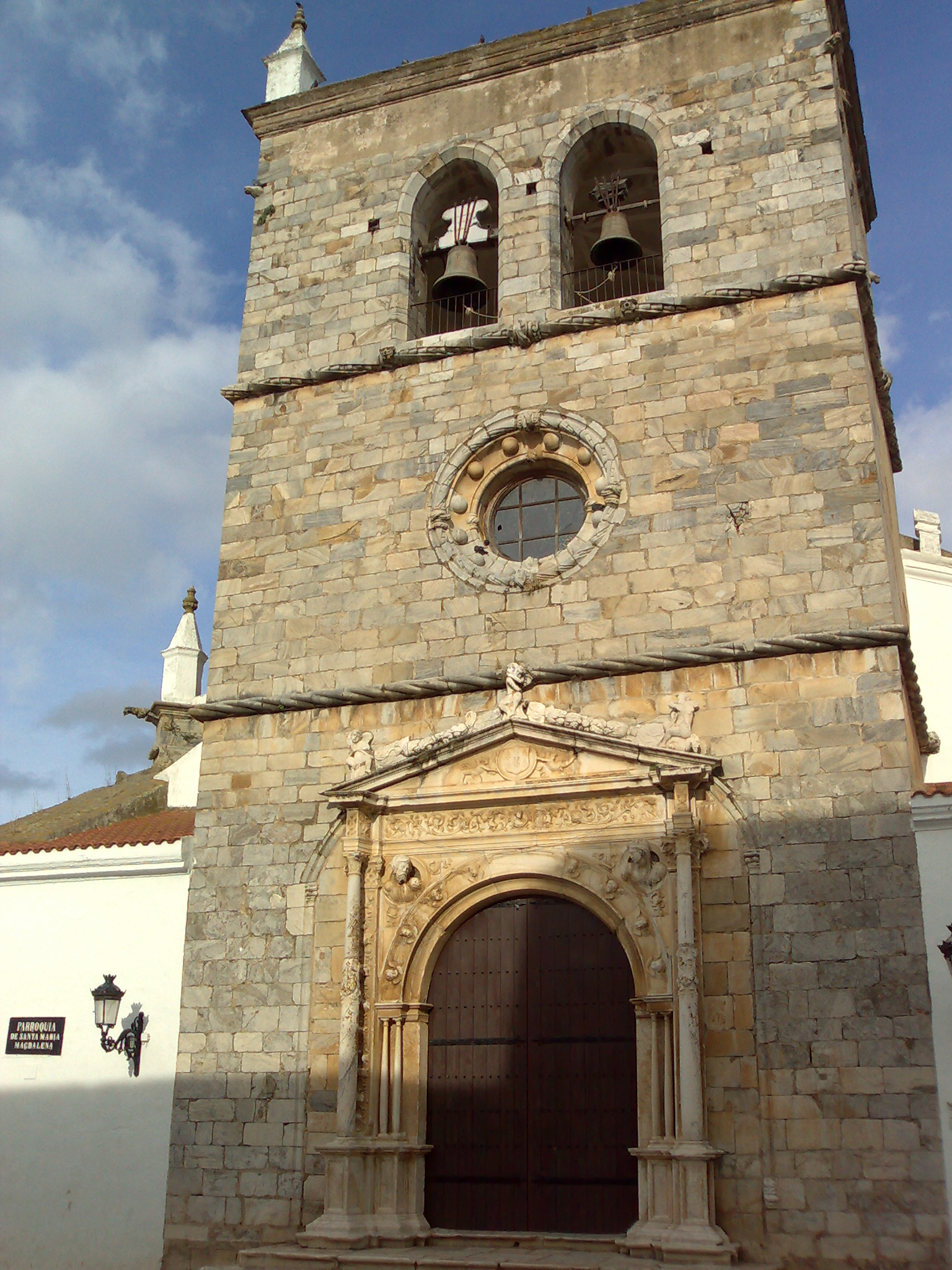
Facade

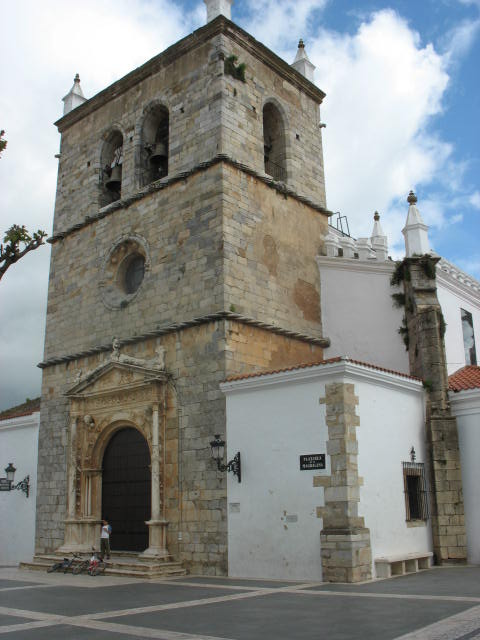
Facade

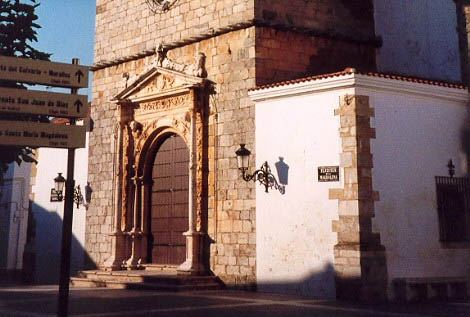
Facade

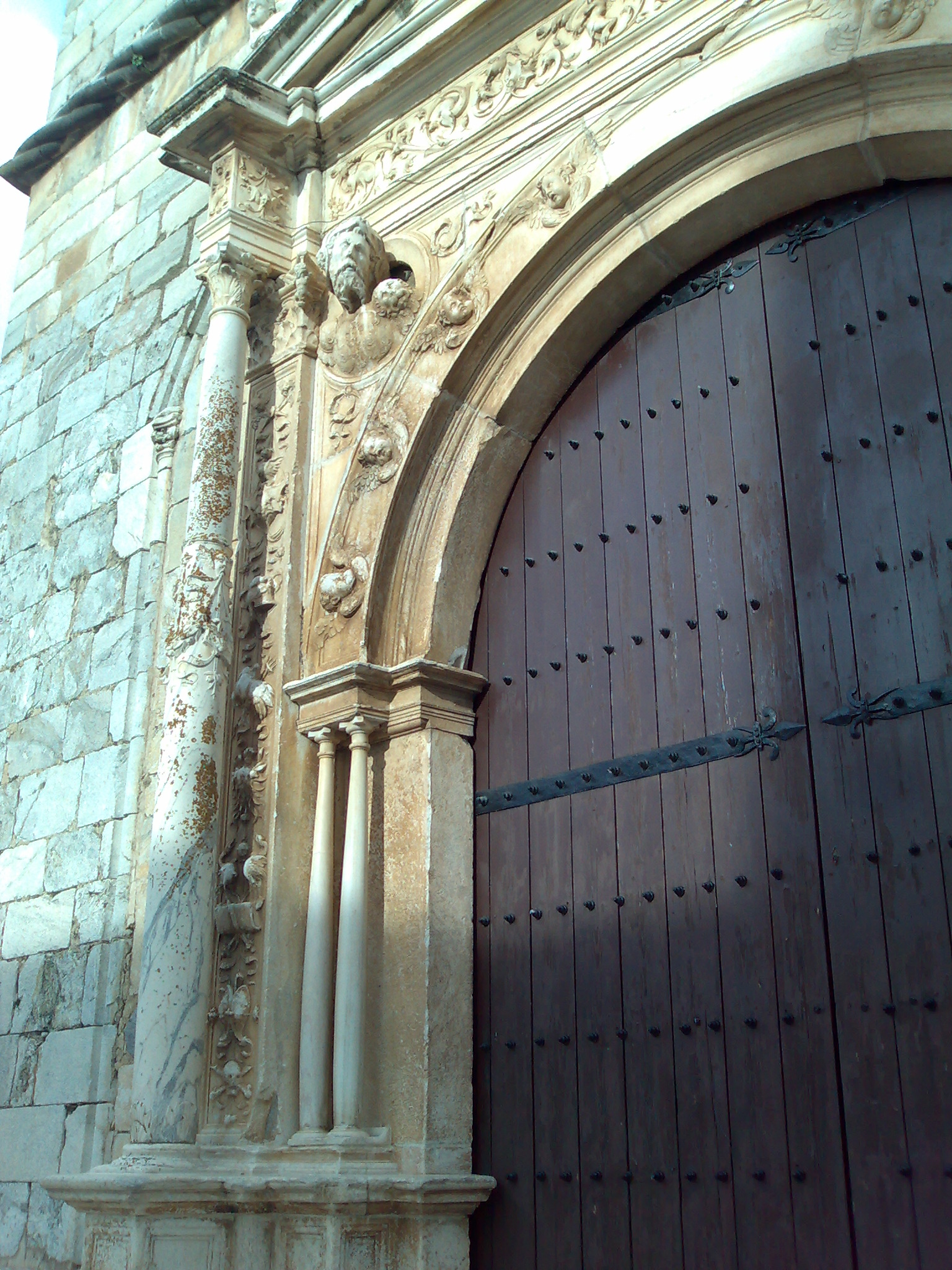
Detail of the main door

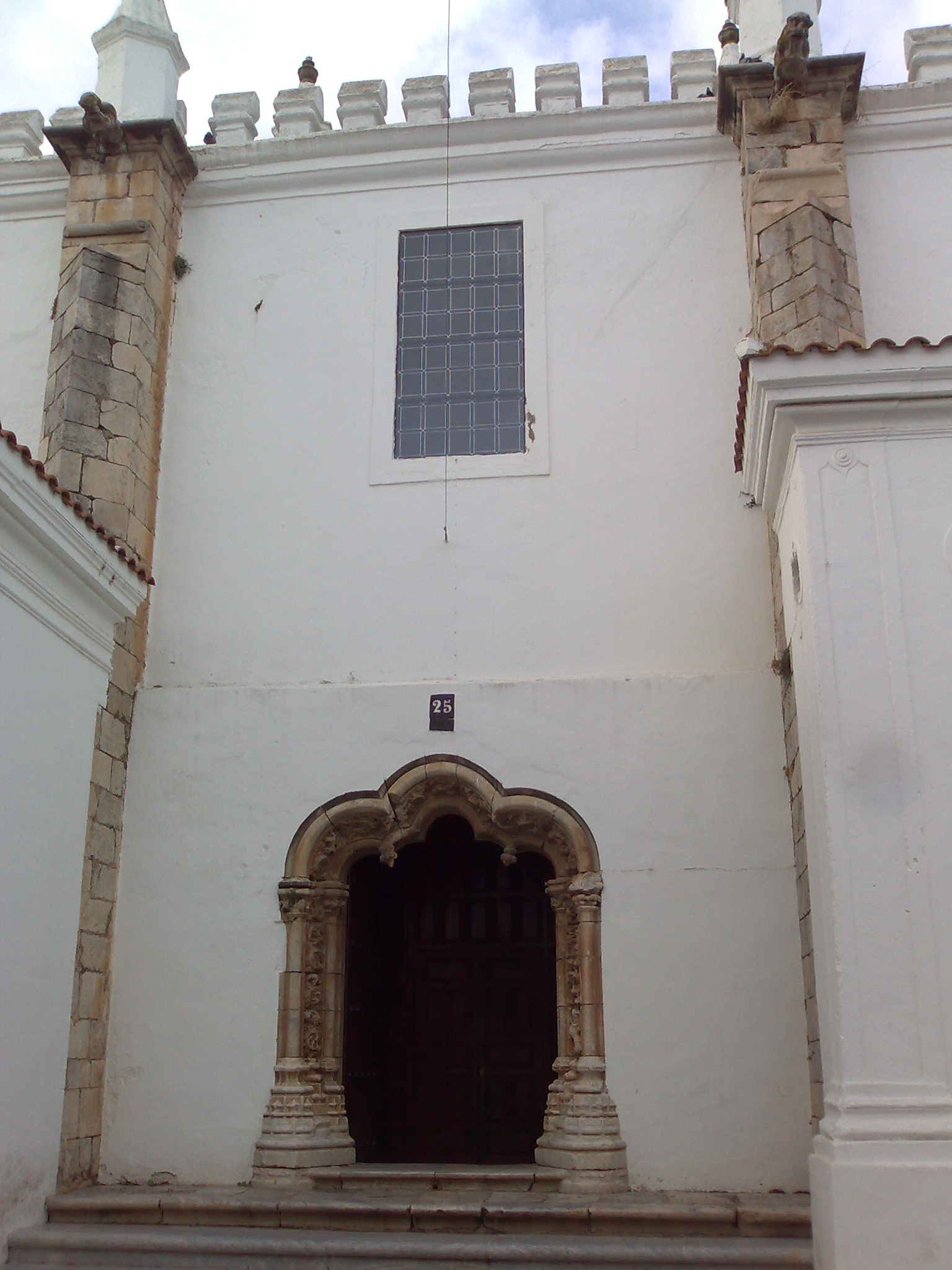
Side door

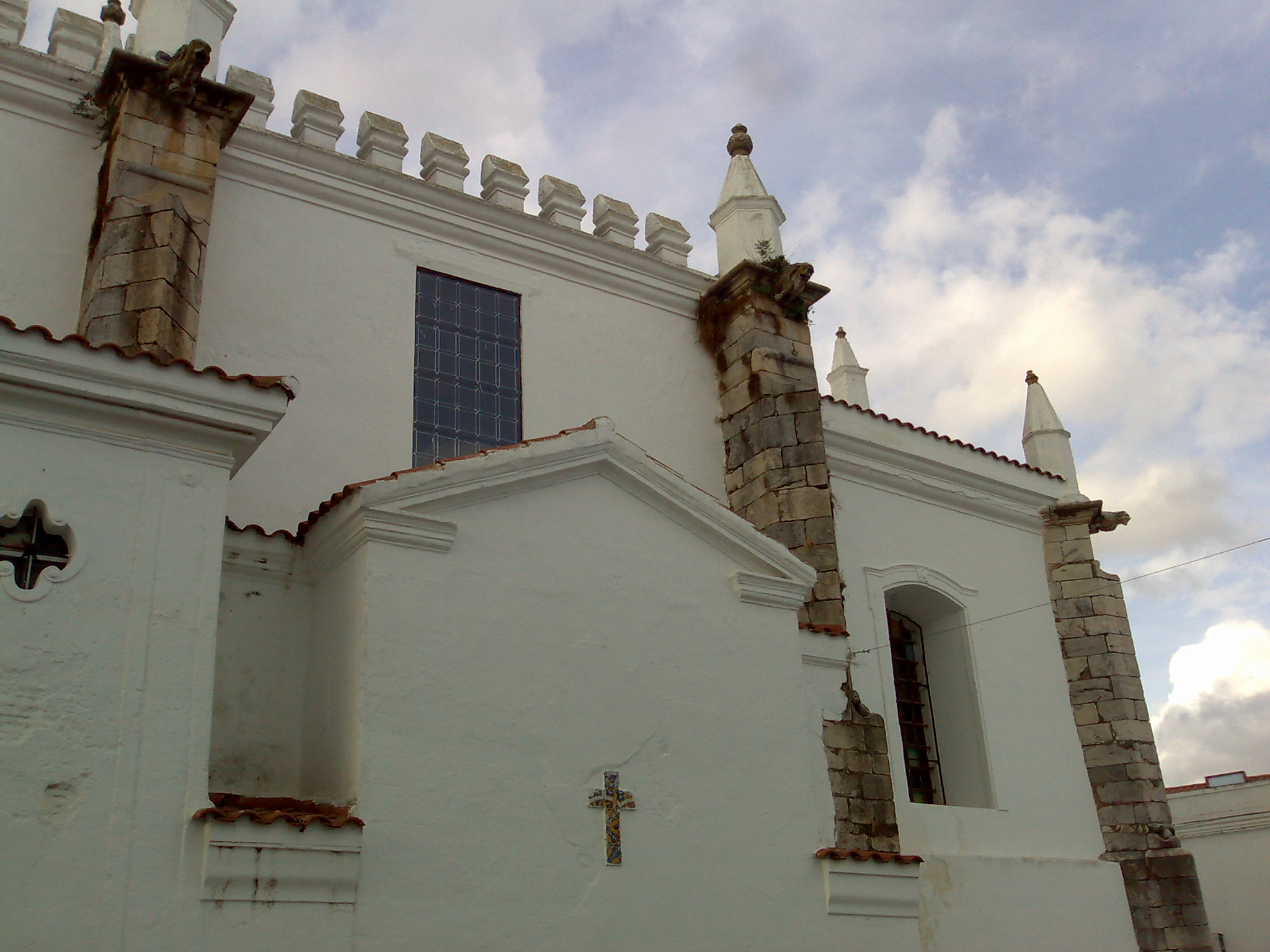
Side view

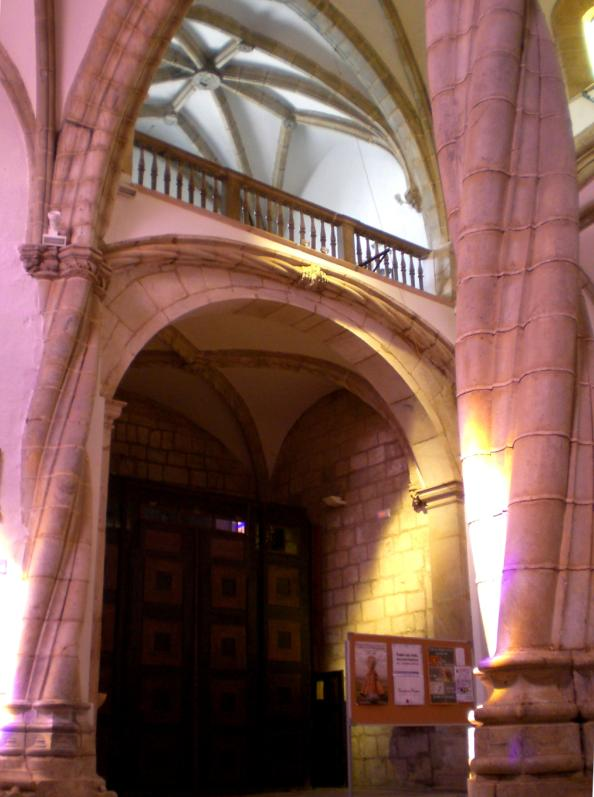
Interior
