= The Landing of Pedro Álvares Cabral in Porto Seguro in 1500 =

Painting by Oscar Pereira da Silva

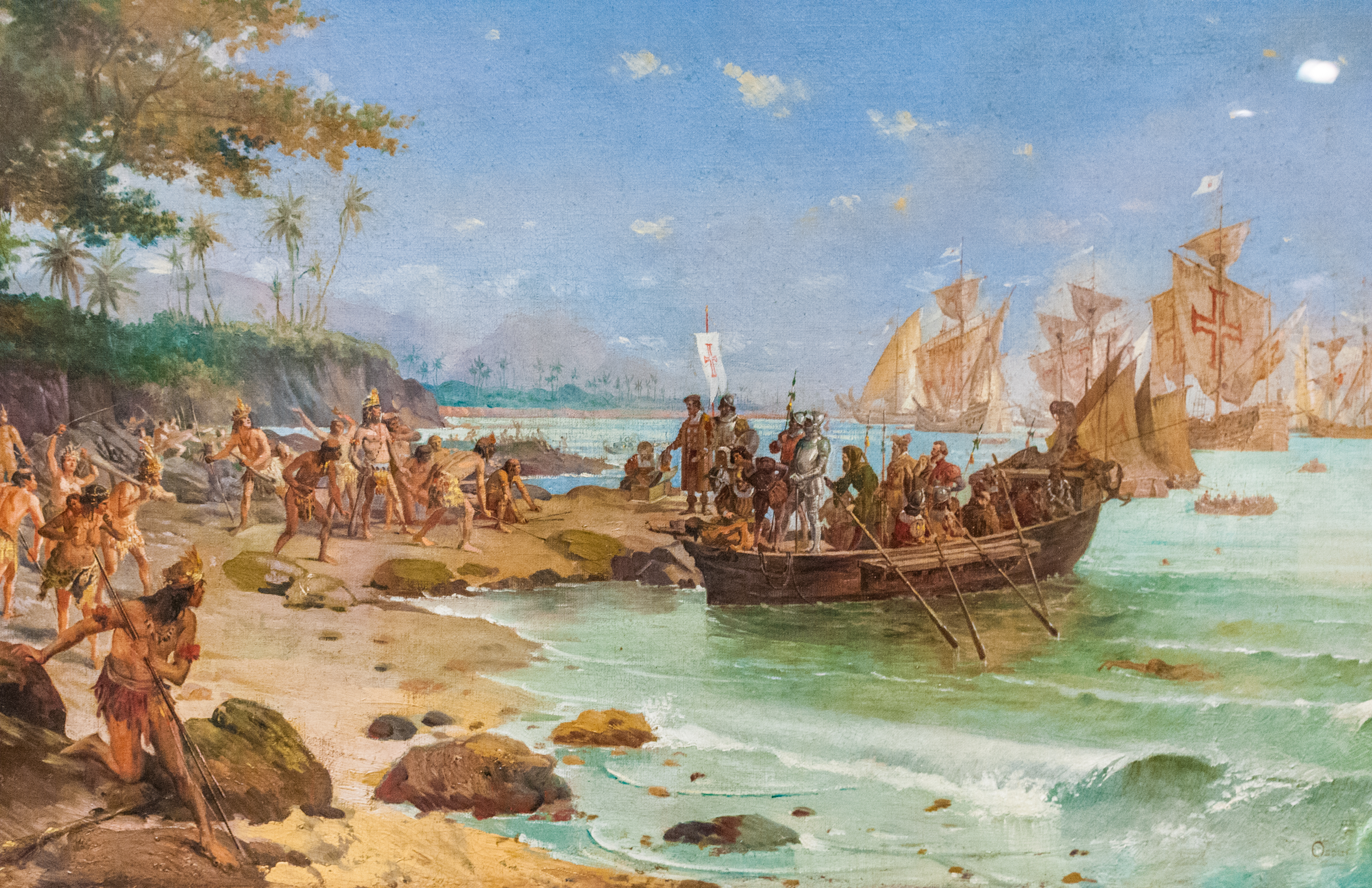
- Artist: Oscar Pereira da Silva
- Year: 1900
- Medium: Oil on canvas
- Subject: Pedro Álvares Cabral, Indigenous Brazilians
- Dimensions: 190 cm × 330 cm (75 in × 130 in)
- Location: Museu Paulista, São Paulo

The Landing of Pedro Álvares Cabral in Porto Seguro in 1500 (Portuguese: Desembarque de Pedro Álvares Cabral em Porto Seguro em 1500) is an oil painting by the Brazilian artist Oscar Pereira da Silva. The work, which was completed in 1900, depicts the first landing of Pedro Álvares Cabral's ships in 1500 on the land of present-day Brazil and the first meeting between Portuguese and indigenous Brazilian people. It established Oscar Pereira da Silva (1867–1939) as a prominent painter on the Brazilian artistic scene of the early 20th century. Pereira da Silva's painting is one of the most-referenced images of Pedro Álvares Cabral's arrival in Brazil, and is widely used in both textbooks and other academic publications. The painting was well received by society and the press of the time; its representation of indigenous Brazilians has been subsequently reexamined.

== Purchase and display ==
Pereira da Silva began work on the painting in 1900. The Landing of Pedro Álvares Cabral in Porto Seguro in 1500 was sold to the Paulista Museum, also known as the Ipiranga Museum, in 1902 after a period of intense negotiation between the artist and the museum. The Paulista Museum sought to build an idea of national identity through the artistic narrative of its collection in the period. The painting, however, was transferred and became part of the collection of the Pinacoteca of the State of São Paulo in 1905, where it remained until 1929. It was transferred back to the collection of the Museu Paulista, where it remains.

== Description ==
The Landing of Pedro Álvares Cabral in Porto Seguro in 1500 depicts a large group of indigenous people on a beach of Porto Seguro, Bahia, with others arriving through the dense woods that surrounds the sand, to greet Pedro Álvares Cabral. The indigenous people are shown in running positions, shouting, and wielding the spears; they are depicted as euphoric with the arrival of Cabral. At sea, it is possible to observe a small vessel that approaches the coast with indigenous Brazilians who had already spent the night in Cabral's caravel. In the central region of the screen are Cabral and an assistant, standing on the beach, coming into contact with an indigenous leader. The painting depicts the indigenous people making an uproar, while the Portuguese are depicted without surprise at the new territory.

The painting is divided between two very well-defined areas. In the first, there is the plane of the ocean, with boats and their Portuguese crew, who carry the Cross of the Order of Christ in standard and in the sails of the caravels. The other is the land plane, the area of indigenous Brazilians, who are represented as curious, cornered, and confused. They are surrounded with dense vegetation which assimilates them with the universe of nature. To portray the encounter between the Christian civilization of the Portuguese and the pagan nature of the indigenous people, Oscar Pereira da Silva used the application of lights and white and blue zones for the Portuguese, and heavier and darker colors to represent with the indigenous population.

The painting was included in the exhibition "Imagens Recriam a História" in 2007, which examined representation and interpretation in historical paintings in Brazil.
