= Oscar Pereira da Silva =

Brazilian painter (1867–1939)

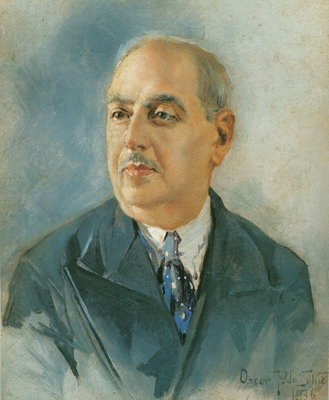
- Born: 29 August 1867; São Fidélis, Brazil
- Died: 17 January 1939 (aged 71); São Paulo, Brazil

Oscar Pereira da Silva (August 29, 1867 – January 17, 1939) was a Brazilian painter, draftsman, designer, and instructor. He was active from the end of the 19th to the mid-20th century. He is noted for his depictions of historical events in Brazil, but also completed numerous portraits, religious works, genre scenes, still lifes, and landscapes. He "paid no attention to Brazilian folk tradition" and painted in an "antique style." After a period of study in France, he pursued a lucrative career in São Paulo, where his works are displayed at the Pinacoteca do Estado de São Paulo and the Museu do Ipiranga.

He is the Patron of the 47th chair of the Brazilian Academy of Fine Arts.

== Early career ==
Pereira da Silva was born in São Fidélis. He showed an early interest in drawing and painting. He enrolled at the Imperial Academy of Fine Arts in 1882 and studied with Eliseu Visconti, Eduardo de Sá, and João Batista da Costa. He became a student of Zeferino da Costa, Victor Meirelles, Chaves Pinheiro, and José Maria de Medeiros. He assisted Zeferino da Costa assistant in the interior painting of the Candelária Church (Igreja da Candelária), Rio de Janeiro, in 1887. Based on this experience, he completed paintings of the interior of the Church of Santa Cecília São Paulo.

Numerous churches and chapels of the colonial period were replaced by Gothic Revival or neo-colonial buildings in the early 20th century. This movement provided Da Silva and contemporaries such as Benedito Calixto commissions to work in religious buildings. In addition to the Church of Santa Cecília, both worked in the Church of Santa Ifigênia, the Church of Our Lady of Consolação and the Church of Our Lady of the Rosary. Pereira da Silva also carried out decorative works for the Church of Our Lady of the Conception.

=== Study in France ===
Pereira da Silva won the last prize for study abroad granted by the emperor Pedro II of Brazil. He moved to Paris in 1889, and was a student at the École des Beaux-Arts, studying under Jean-Léon Gérôme and Léon Bonnat. He rejected the artistic movements of the Paris school, but produced several studies and paintings.

== Later career ==
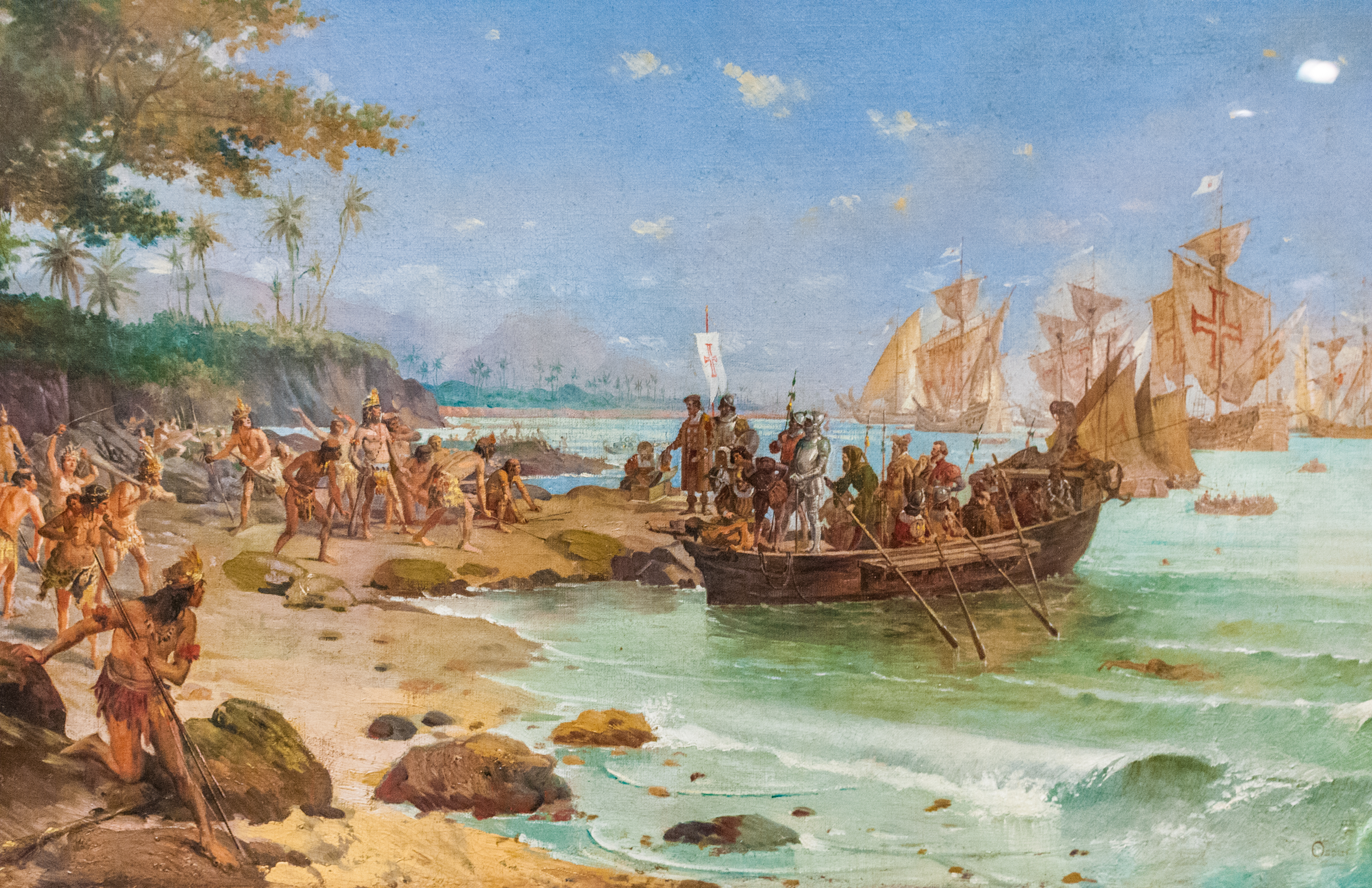
O Desembarque de Cabral em Porto Seguro ("The Landing of Pedro Álvares Cabral in Porto Seguro in 1500", 1900

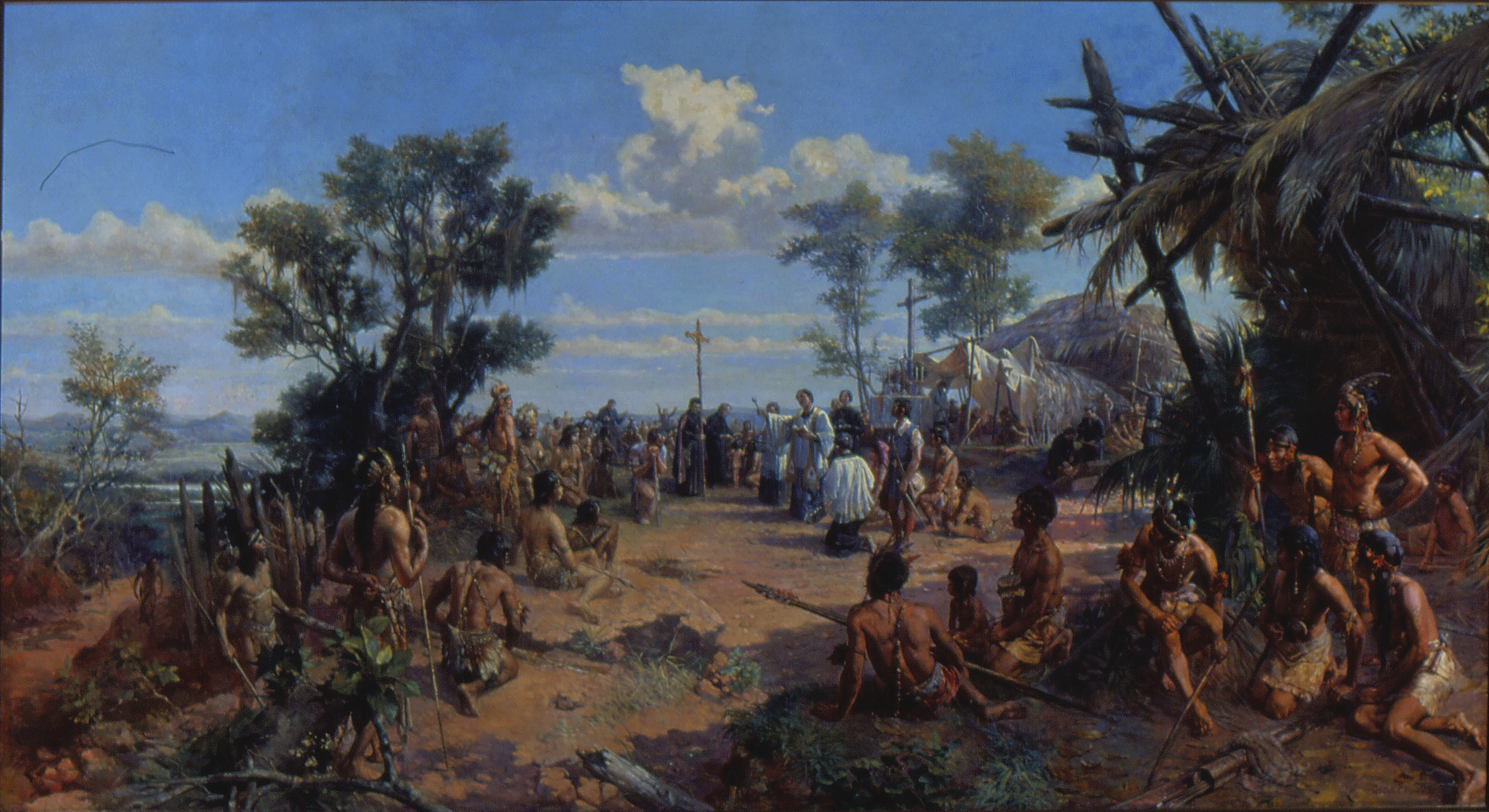
Fundação de São Paulo ("The Foundation of São Paulo", 1909

Pereira da Silva returned to Brazil in 1896. He held a solo exhibition in the hall of the Escola de Belas Artes (School of Fine Arts) in Rio de Janeiro, where 33 of his work completed in Europe were presented. In the same year, he moved to São Paulo and taught at the São Paulo School of Arts and Crafts (LAOSP) and at the State Gymnasium of São Paulo. In addition, he taught private classes in his studio and completed portraits of the elite of the city. In 1897, he founded the Núcleo Artístico, which later became the School of Fine Arts. He completed three murals between 1903 and 1911 for the Municipal Theater of São Paulo: O Teatro na Grécia Antiga ("Theater in Ancient Greece"), A Dança ("Dance"), and A Música ("Music").

Da Silva's main works located in the city of São Paulo. They include Escrava Romana ("The Roman Slave", 1894) and Infância de Giotto ("The Childhood of Giotto", 1895). He turned to historical paintings in response to nationalist trends in Brazil at the beginning of the 20th century. This initially resulted in O Desembarque de Cabral em Porto Seguro ("The Landing of Cabral at Porto Seguro", 1900), and soon the Fundação de São Paulo ("The Foundation of São Paulo", 1909).

Da Silva, like numerous artists and architects of Brazil, was influenced by the Modern Art Week in 1922; his artistic production was further transformed by a trip to Paris in 1930. His daughter, the artist Helena Pereira da Silva (1895–1966), observed that Da Silva's work became more carefree in this period; he used a lighter palette than his earlier works. However, the importance of drawing as a basic and fundamental structure of his compositions never ceased to exist in the execution of his paintings.

== Death ==
Oscar Pereira da Silva died of cardiac arrest while working in his home studio in São Paulo on January 17, 1939. Many of his works are preserved and displayed at the Pinacoteca do Estado de São Paulo and the Museu do Ipiranga of the University of São Paulo.
