= Tomás de Torres =

Portuguese astrologer

Tomás de Torres was a Portuguese teacher of King John III of Portugal, an astrologer and an eminent doctor during the early 16th century in Portugal. He was satirized by Gil Vicente in one of his plays as Doctor Torres in the Auto dos Físicos (Play of the Physicians). He had an influence in Portuguese palace life, was one of the most prominent astrologers in Portugal, and influenced many astrologers including the ones that made great prophecies about King Sebastian's life that would take him to the Battle of Ksar El Kebir where he died leading Portugal to a dynastic crisis.
