= Santa Cruz Cabrália =

- Municipality
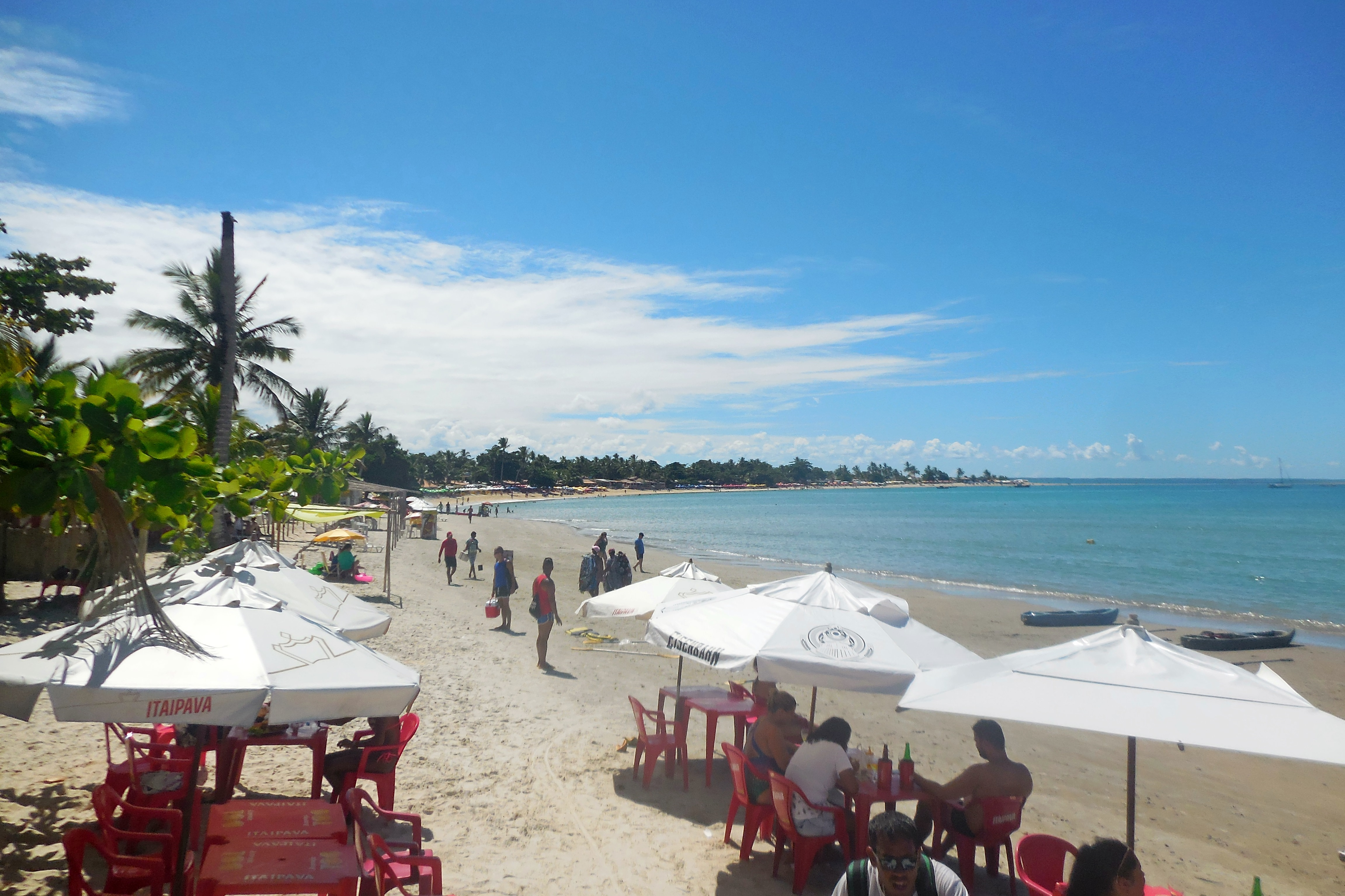
- View of Beach in Santa Cruz Cabrália

- Flag Coat of arms

- Location in Brazil
- Coordinates: 16°16′40″S 39°1′30″W
- Country: Brazil
- Region: Nordeste
- State: Bahia

Population (2021)
  - Total: 28.058
- Time zone: UTC−3 (BRT)

Santa Cruz Cabrália is a municipality in the state of Bahia in the North-East region of Brazil.

== Historical Sites ==
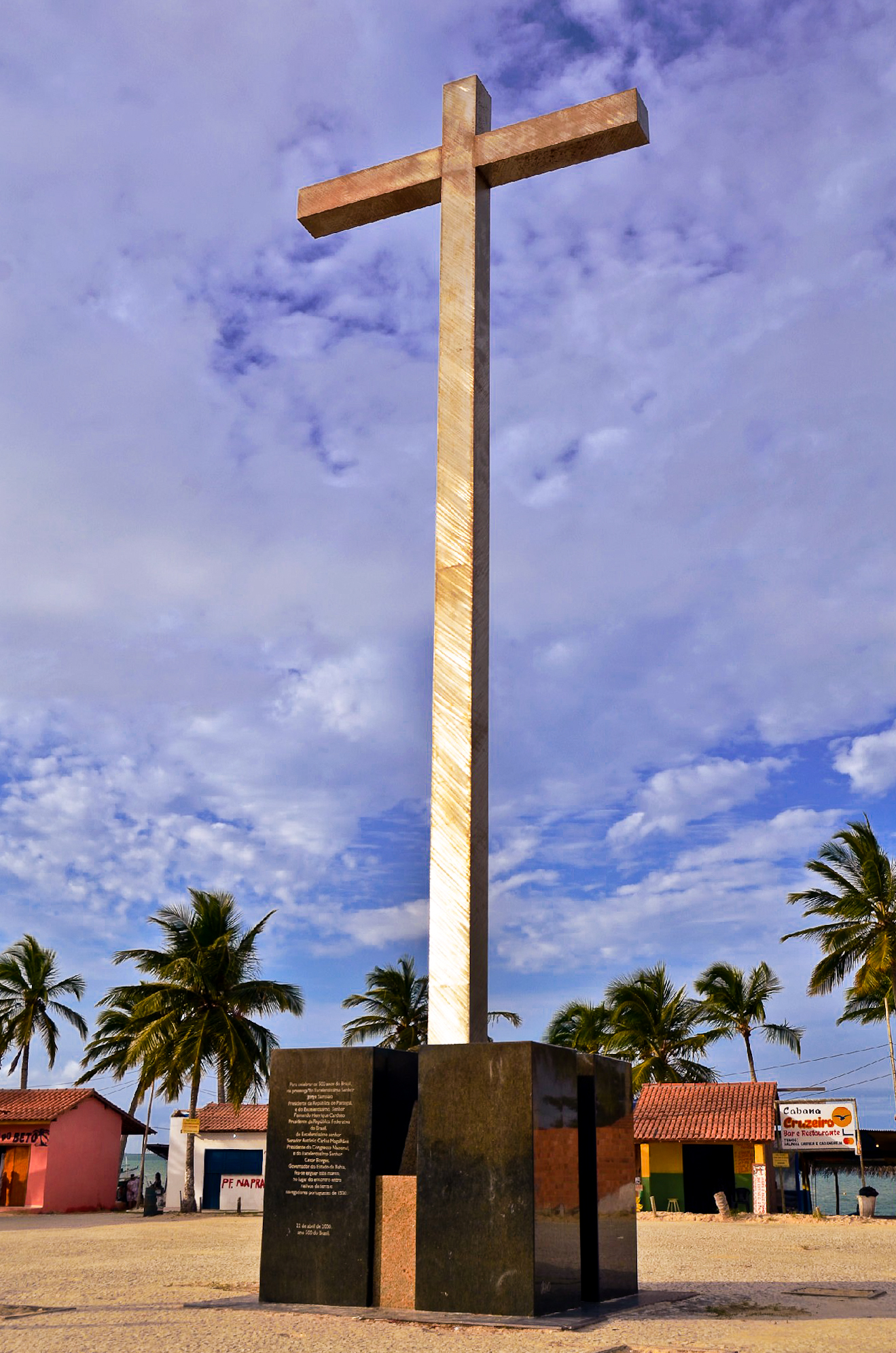
A Cross built in 2000, to mark the possible location of the first mass in Brazil in 1500. It is located in the middle of a square by the beach.

== See also ==
- List of municipalities in Bahia
