= 3rd Portuguese India Armada (Nova, 1501) =

Portuguese armada

The Third Portuguese India Armada was assembled in 1501 upon the order of King Manuel I of Portugal and placed under the command of João da Nova. It was small compared to other armadas of the same type and was formed for commercial purposes. Nonetheless, it engaged in the first significant Portuguese naval battle in the Indian Ocean. The Third Armada discovered the uninhabited islands of Ascension and Saint Helena in the South Atlantic Ocean. Some speculate that it was the first Portuguese armada to reach Ceylon (now Sri Lanka).

== Fleet ==
Little is known about the Third Armada of 1501 as opposed to other early Portuguese India armadas. Chroniclers' accounts are scant on details and differ significantly at several points. Very few contemporary documents offer substantive information, such as reconciliations of differing accounts or missing details.

The Third Armada was primarily a commercial run to India. It is confirmed to have been composed of four ships: two owned by the crown and two privately owned. There may have been a fifth supply ship.

Ship name	Captain	Notes
1. Uncertain	João da Nova	Flagship, owned by crown
2. Uncertain	Francisco de Novais	Owned by crown
3. Uncertain	Diogo Barbosa	Privately owned by D. Álvaro of Braganza, partially outfitted by Marchionni consortium
4. Uncertain	Fernão Vinet	Florentine. Private, owned by Marchionni consortium. Partner Girolamo Sernigi may have been aboard as factor.
5. Supply ship?	Unknown	Uncertain if existed. If it did, it probably scuttled and burned along the way.

This list of captains is given in João de Barros's Décadas, Damião de Góis's Chronica, Fernão Lopes de Castanheda's História, Diogo do Couto's list, Manuel de Faria e Sousa's Asia and Quintella's Annaes. Fernão Pacheco replaces Barbosa in several lists: Gaspar Correia's Lendas and the Relação das Naus. The Livro de Lisuarte de Abreu replaces Novais and Barbosa with Rui de Abreu and Duarte Pacheco, respectively.

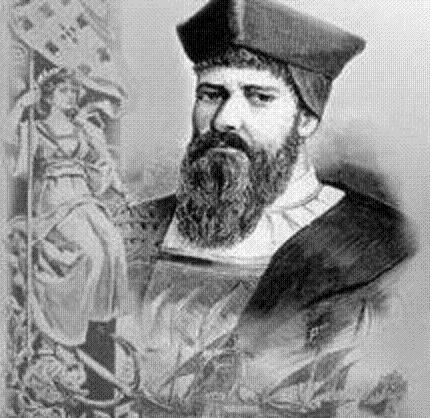
João da Nova

The modest armada carried 350–400 men, only 80 of which were armed. Its admiral was João da Nova, a Galician-born minor noble. He was Alcalde Pequeno (municipal magistrate) of Lisbon, and his principal recommendation to the admiralship was probably his connection to the powerful Portuguese nobleman Tristão da Cunha.

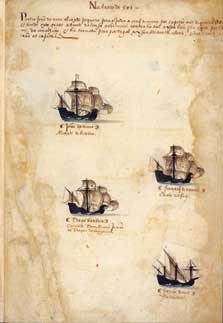
Fleet of the 3rd India Armada (Nova, 1501), from the Memória das Armadas

The owners of the two private ships, D. Álvaro of Braganza and Bartolomeo Marchionni, a Florentine, had jointly outfitted the Anunciada, one of the ships of the Second India Armada of Pedro Álvares Cabral that was still at sea at the time. It was a considerable gamble for them to outfit the new ships before knowing the results of the previous enterprise. The Anunciada safely returned to Lisbon later in 1501 with a large cargo of spices.

Suggestions that da Nova's ships were sent to reinforce Cabral’s ships following the outbreak of war with the Calicut kingdom (e.g., “as the plight of the Portuguese at Calicut was acute, three ships were sent on ahead under the Admiral, Joao da Nova Castella, to reinforce de Cabral, the Portuguese commander in India”.) are now doubted because the Portuguese monarchy was unaware of the outbreak of war at India until the first of Cabral's ships returned to Lisbon some six months after da Nova sailed from Lisbon. It has also been suggested that da Nova was charged to block any attempt by the Spanish to enter the spice trade. If true, given the small size of his fleet, he was entrusted with a very delicate mission.

One of the passengers on the fleet was Paio Rodrigues, employed by D. Álvaro of Braganza to remain in India as a factor for the private consortium. Another was Álvaro de Braga, a crown factor who was heading for the African port of Sofala.

== Mission ==
The objective of the Third Armada was wholly commercial. Its mission was to go to India, load up with spices, and return home. The journey was expected to be uneventful.

The journey's destination was Calicut (known as Calecute in some sources, now Kozhikode), the principal spice hub in the state of Kerala and the dominant city-state on the Malabar coast of India. The Third Armada expected – or hoped – that the well-equipped Second India Armada of Pedro Álvares Cabral, which had departed in the previous year (1500), had succeeded in its ambassadorial mission to secure a treaty with Calicut and set up a factory (feitoria, a trading hub) there. The armada was unaware that Cabral's Second Armada had not only failed in its mission, but it also began hostilities between Portugal and Calicut. João da Nova's Third Armada was sailing into a war that it did not expect and for which it was not equipped.

The Third Armada also seems to have had a planned intermediary destination at Sofala, where Cabral had been instructed to set up a factory. According to Correia, the crown ship of Francisco de Novais was designated to trade for gold in Sofala and leave the factor Álvaro de Braga, the clerk Diogo Barbosa (same name as captain) and an additional twenty-two men. Cabral's Second Armada had also already failed that mission: there was no Portuguese factory in Sofala.

The armada could not have delayed its departure until the arrival of the news of the Second Armada. The seasonal monsoon wind patterns of the Indian Ocean forced India-bound expeditions to leave Lisbon by April at the latest to find favorable southeasterly summer winds from Africa to India. Those same wind patterns determined that returning fleets could only arrive in Europe in the summer, June at the earliest. Although the difference between one fleet's departure and another fleet's arrival was only a few months, outbound fleets could not delay their departure until the previous year's fleet returned; if they did, an entire year would be lost. Therefore, both the crown and the private consortiums were willing to equip and launch the Third Armada in March 1501 before they received any news of the outcome of the Second Armada. The first ship of the Second Armada to arrive only did so in late June.

Nova's Third Armada would learn of the Second Armada's voyage along its own voyage from notes and letters left by Cabral's ships at African staging posts. Even if the Third Armada learned about the misfortune of the Second Armada, the aforementioned conditions meant that it could not go home to acquire reinforcements or otherwise change the circumstances of its journey. Lightly armed, it would have to press on, sneak into India stealthily, avoid Calicut, load spices at friendly ports, and leave, all as quickly as possible.

== Outward voyage ==
The date of the third Portuguese armada's departure from Lisbon to India has variously been quoted as 1 March, 5 March, 11 March, 26–27 March or 10 April.

Two chronicles claimed the ships discovered Ascension Island during the outward voyage, naming it Conception Island. Thus, João de Barros wrote that passing eight degrees beyond the equator, towards the south, an island was found to which the name Concepcão was given whilst Damião de Góis’ later chronicle described the sighting of an island south of the line which was named Conçeicam. There are at least three reasons why it is thought this name was quoted by de Barros in error, this later being repeated by de Góis. First, the Church of Rome has long celebrated the feast of the Immaculate Conception of the Virgin Mary on the fixed date of 8 December, yet by then the third armada had already reached India. Second, the Portuguese Cantino Planisphere, completed in 1502 after the third armada returned, shows the newly sighted island marked as ilha achada e chamada Ascenssam [island found and called Ascension], not as Conception. Third, in 1503 a division of the 4th Portuguese India Armada (Gama, 1502) under Estêvão da Gama also named the island as Ascension, not as Conception. It is usually presumed that the island was discovered on the movable feast of Ascension Day, which fell on 20 May in 1501, 39 days after Easter.

Two sources, a letter from King Manuel I of Portugal and Gaspar Corrêa’s chronicle, made no mention of either Ascension or Conception, instead describing a visit to Brazil.

The fleet crossed the Cape of Good Hope on July 7, 1501, without a known incident. It anchored at Mossel Bay (Aguada de São Brás). There, Nova found a note in a shoe by a watering hole. The note was left about a month earlier by Pêro de Ataíde, one of the captains of the returning Second Armada. Ataíde's note, addressed to all captains bound for India, warned that Calicut had become hostile to the Portuguese, but that Cochin (Cochim, now Kochi) and Cannanore (now Kannur) were still friendly ports where spices could be procured. It also recommended India-bound captains to go to Malindi, where Pedro Álvares Cabral left letters that contained more detailed information. Centuries later, the South African government declared the milkwood tree where Ataíde hung his shoe a national monument and erected a shoe-shaped postbox below it.

It is speculated that the Mossel Bay Stone found after the demolition of the old Government House bears an inscription of João da Nova's name and provides evidence of this visit It is also believed that da Nova built a hermida or a small hermitage with space for only a few supplicants at a promitory at Mossel Bay. A letter written by Pedro Quaresma to King Manuel II described a visit to this location a few years later in 1506. This same reference source includes a description of the walls of a ruined hermida dedicated to St Blaise on the high ground (Cape St Blaise) between two coves at Mossel Bay in 1576.

In the middle of July 1501, the Third Armada arrived at Mozambique Island. Disregarding instructions, Nova decided against dispatching Novais's ship to Sofala. Nova probably concluded that he needed to take all of his men due to the threat of a military engagement in India. Soon after, he set sail up the East African coast. At the same time, Nova possibly discovered Juan de Nova Island in the Mozambique Channel and the Farquhar atoll, part of the Seychelles, which were named the "João da Nova islands" until the 19th century.

Around the same time, the armada arrived at the Swahili citadel of Kilwa (Quiloa). A Portuguese degredado (convict exile), António Fernandes, greeted them on the beach or on a rowboat. According to Barros and Góis, he was António Fernandes, who carried letters from Cabral; Correia writes that he was Pêro Esteves, who was carrying no letters. The degredado informed Nova of the state of affairs in Kilwa. Barros suggests that, on this occasion, João da Nova personally met Muhammad Arcone, a Kilwan noble who would later play a critical role in Portuguese–Kilwan affairs. Correia notes that Nova was wary of approaching Kilwa, and refused to go ashore despite repeated invitations; he had the degredado negotiate the provision of some supplies, probably citrus fruit, from the city for his scurvy-sick crews and hurriedly moved on.

Barros suggests that in late July, the Third Armada immediately set sail for India after it left Kilwa. Correia claims that Nova sailed first to Malindi to deliver a letter from King Manuel I of Portugal to the Sultan of Malindi. According to Correia, the sultan received the Portuguese well, supplying them amply with biscuits, rice, butter, chickens, sheep and other foods. He further writes that it was now that Nova received the letters that Cabral had dispatched by a messenger from Mozambique, from which he learned more about the Zamorin (monarch) of Calicut, the Portuguese factory at Cochin and the friendly relations with Cannanore and Quilon. In this version, the Third Armada left Malindi on July 28, 1501, and crossed the Indian Ocean after 18 days.

== Nova in India ==
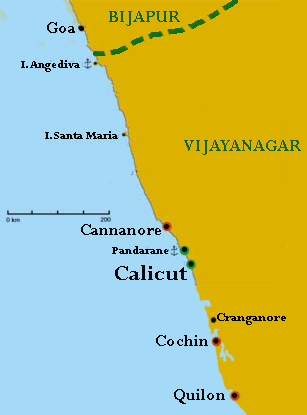
India's Malabar Coast c. 1500

In August 1501, João da Nova's Third Armada arrived in India at the Santa Maria islands off the Malabar coast. According to Correia, Nova named the islands because of the feast of the Assumption of Mary (August 15).

Narratives about the ensuing events differ. Barros says that Nova immediately began going down the Indian coast to Kerala, but Correia claims that he stopped by the port of Batecala (now Bhatkal), which was the principal trade port of the Vijayanagara Empire, and lingered there, engaging in trade with merchants in the harbors, and chasing pirates in Onor (now Honnavar). Both narratives agree that the Third Armada eventually began going down the Indian coast to Kerala, attempting to capture two merchant ships, allegedly from Calicut, near Mount d'Eli (now Ezhimala Hill) along the way.

The two-month delay between the Third Armada's reputed arrival in India (August) and its first recorded activities in India (November) has been subject to speculation. Correia suggests that the Third Armada simply lingered in the area between Batecala and Mount d'Eli to trade and perhaps engage in piracy before it headed south to Cannanore. Others hypothesize that during this interlude, Nova launched exploratory ventures far to the south below Cape Comorin to locate the fabled island of Taprobana (Ceylon), the world's main source of cinnamon.

The Third Armada arrived in Cannanore in November. They were well received by the Kolathiri Raja of Cannanore, who immediately urged João da Nova to load his ships with spices from the city's markets. Nova rejected the offer because he first had to collect the supplies already acquired by the Portuguese factory in Cochin. Before leaving, Nova left a few agents with instructions to purchase spices, principally ginger and cinnamon, in Cannanore to be loaded later.

Some sources note that Nova established the Portuguese factory in Cannanore at this point. However, the factor whom he left behind was Paio Rodrigues, a private agent of D. Álvaro of Braganza and the Marchionni consortium, not an employee of the Casa da India, the crown trading house. The Casa itself, a proxy of the Portuguese Crown, would only install a factor in Cannanore with the Fourth Armada.

While he was in Cannanore, João da Nova received an embassy from the Zamorin of Calicut. Accompanying the embassy was Gonçalo Peixoto, a Portuguese survivor of the previous year's massacre who had remained in Calicut for the past year. In a letter to Nova, the Zamorin expressed sadness at the Calicut Massacre of December 1500, blaming it on hatred between Muslims and Christians that he never understood. He claimed that he, as a Hindu prince, only had a desire for friendship and peace with Portugal. The Zamorin also reported that the ringleaders of the riot had been rounded up and punished, and invited Nova to Calicut to collect the wares left behind in the Portuguese factory and receive compensation. Proposing to dispatch two ambassadors with Nova's fleet back to Lisbon, he expressed a desire to make a final treaty with King Manuel I of Portugal. The Kolathiri Raja of Cannanore recommended Nova to accept the offer. Gonçalo Peixoto warned Nova to reject the offer, claiming that the Zamorin was luring him into a trap and at the time preparing a war fleet in Calicut. Nova did not reply to the Zamorin's entreaty. Peixoto joined Nova's fleet.

Correia asserts that Peixoto did not come; Nova agreed to the offer from the Zamorin's emissary to Cannanore and sailed to Calicut. The Third Armada anchored by the harbor there, waiting for the promised wares to be shipped from shore, when an unnamed Christian came aboard and warns him about the Zamorin's intentions. Before Nova left, he captured three merchant ships, including one owned by the Zamorin himself, at the mouth of Calicut harbor. He seized their cargoes and burned the vessels in plain view of the city. Valuable loot from the ships included silver Indian nautical instruments, and navigational charts.

Arriving in Cochin, João da Nova encountered a factor left by Cabral, Gonçalo Gil Barbosa, who reports trading difficulties in the local markets. Indian spice merchants required payment in silver, but Cabral had left the factor only with Portuguese goods, mainly cloth. He was expected to use the trading revenue from the sale of the Portuguese goods to buy spices. However, the Portuguese wares had little value in Indian markets, so Barbosa still had his unsold stock and was unable to obtain silver to buy spices. The factor suspected that Arab merchant guilds had engineered a boycott of Portuguese goods in India. He also reported that the Trimumpara Raja of Cochin, despite his alliance and protection of the factory, was furious at the Portuguese because Cabral's Second Armada had departed too suddenly, taking two noble Cochinese noble hostages with it.

Sources ascribe the lack of silver cash as the pressing problem that Nova did not anticipate. He did not bring much because he expected to raise cash through selling Portuguese goods.

Nova immediately set sail back to Cannanore to see if the agents whom he left there had raised cash, but they faced the same problem. The Kolathiri Raja of Cannanore finally intervened, placing himself as security for the sale of spices to the Portuguese on credit and allowing the Portuguese to obtain spices.

=== Discovery of Ceylon ===
In 1898, excavations underneath the Breakwater Office in Colombo, Sri Lanka, revealed a boulder with a Portuguese inscription, a coat of arms, and the clearly denoted date 1501. That was four years before Lourenço de Almeida's arrival on the island, the formal date (1505) of the Portuguese discovery of Ceylon.

Much speculation has surrounded the inscription. The earliest theory was that the boulder was an uncompleted gravestone for a Portuguese captain born in 1501 (death date missing). However, the arms and style of the inscription appeared to be of a padrão, the typical marker of a Portuguese claim. Some argue that the date is simply a mistake or that the "1" in 1501 is a poorly carved digit. Another theory is that what appears to be a number is actually an acronym, ISOI (Iesus Salvator Orientalium Indicorum – "Jesus the Savior of the East Indies"). Nonetheless, some historians, notably Bouchon in 1980, have argued that the inscription was made by a captain of the Third Armada of 1501. The sources that describe the journey of the armada do not record that it stumbled upon Ceylon, but the journey of the armada was poorly recorded as a whole.

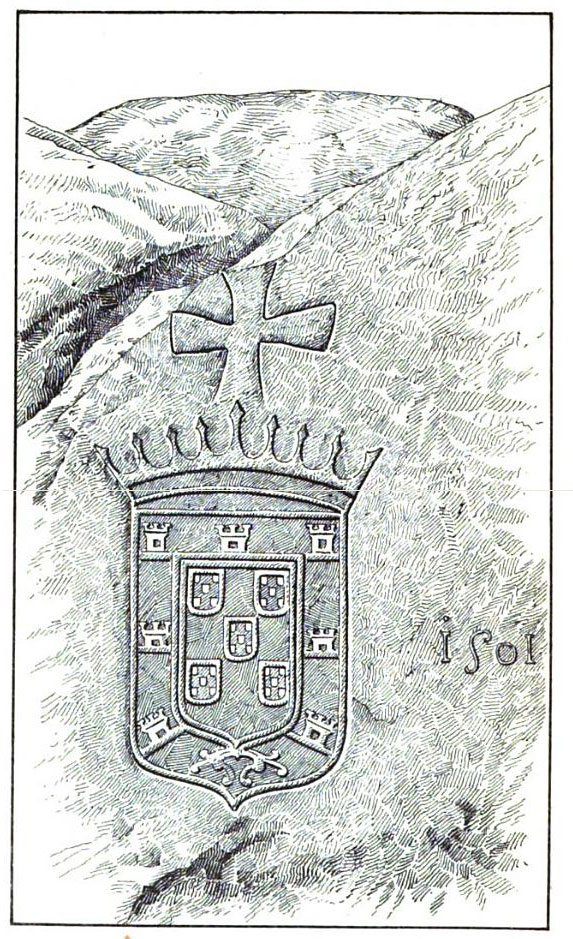
Portuguese inscription on a boulder in Colombo, Sri Lanka, dated 1501, conjectured to have been left by the Third Armada

Bouchon (1980) speculates that the discovery happened during an exploratory venture launched from Anjediva Island or the Santa Maria islands. Another theory that he suggests (p. 257) is that the journey to Ceylon was sometime in late November or early December 1501. Under this scenario, Nova did not immediately return to Cannanore after he realized the cash problem, but rather he or one of his captains either stumbled upon Ceylon or was guided there by a local, hoping for better success there.

None of these theories are confirmed or suggested in any written accounts.

=== First Battle of Cannanore ===
In mid-December 1501, the Third Armada was preparing to leave India, loaded with spices from Cannanore and other goods from piratical attacks. News arrived, however, that a battle fleet led by the Zamorin was approaching.

Sometime in December, Nova's fleet was cornered by the Zamorin's fleet as he was about to leave Cannanore. The Zamorin's fleet comprised nearly 40 large ships, and 180 small ships called paraus and zambuks. He commanded an estimated 7,000 men.

The Raja of Cannanore urged Nova to stay under his protection and avoid conflict. Nova rejected the Raja's offer, attempting to break out with a favorable breeze. The Third Armada fired its cannons to breach the Zamorin's line. Once a breach was opened, four Portuguese ships charged into the breach in a column formation, their side cannons blasting. The pounding from the cannons and the height of Nova's ships prevented the Calicut forces from boarding the Portuguese ships with grappling hooks. The less seaworthy fleet of the Zamorin, pursuing the escaping Portuguese, began to splinter due to intense cannon fire. The increased distance between the slowed-down Calicut fleet and the Third Armada caused the former to stop aiming to board the Portuguese ships, causing the battle to become a ranged artillery duel. The Calicut fleet retreated after it realized that its cannons' range and reloading speed could not match those of the Third Armada. Nova gave a brief chase, finally breaking up the engagement on January 2, 1502.

After two days of fighting, the Third Armada had sunk five large ships and about a dozen oar-driven boats. It inflicted great damage on the remaining vessels of the Zamorin while it was not damaged much itself.

Although João da Nova was not prepared for a fight, the two-day naval battle off Cannanore is regarded by some as the first significant Portuguese naval engagement in the Indian Ocean. It was not the first clash between Portuguese and Indian ships – Vasco da Gama's First Armada and Cabral's Second Armada also fought with various Indian fleets. Earlier encounters were fought against mostly poorly armed merchant ships, pirates and isolated squads; a single well-armed caravel could win a battle against these targets with ease. In the First Battle of Cannanore, the Zamorin of Calicut had attacked directly, deploying the best fleet he could against a small group of Portuguese merchant carracks, which were significantly less heavily armed than the ships of Gama and Cabral.

According to the Portuguese Navy's official website, the battle is also historically notable for being one of the earliest recorded deliberate uses of a naval column, later called line of battle, and for being resolved by cannon fire alone. The tactics used in the battle became increasingly prevalent as naval technology and strategy evolved, causing the battle to have been called the first modern naval battle.

== Return voyage ==
In early 1502, the Third Armada captured another Calicut merchant ship near Mount d'Eli, which it sacked, burned and sunk. It began the return voyage soon afterwards. The armada made two watering stops in East Africa: first at Malindi, where Nova deposited letters that would be received later that year by Thomé Lopes, and second at Mozambique Island.

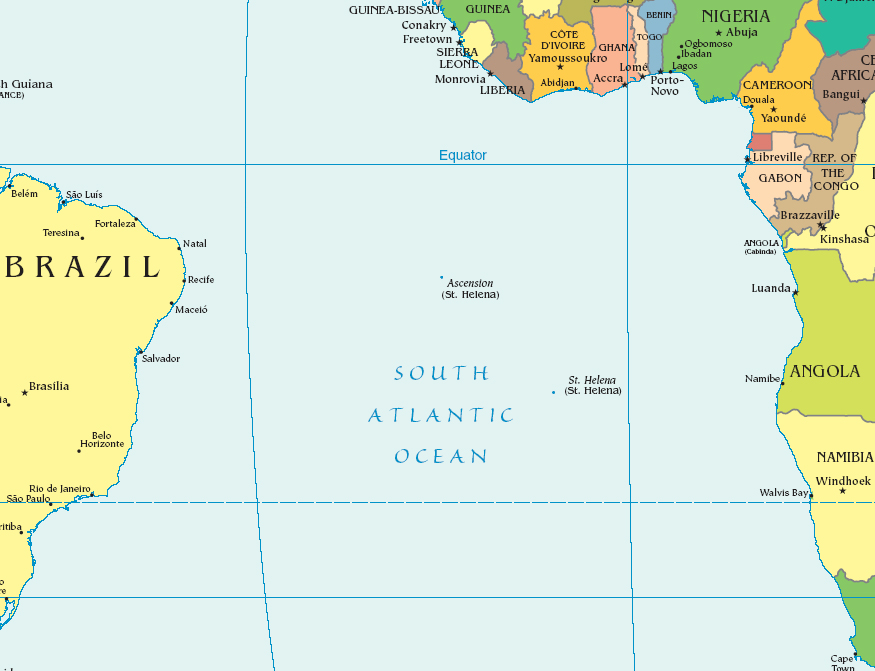
Positions of Ascension island (discovered by the Third Armada in May 1501) and Saint Helena (discovered May 1502) in the South Atlantic Ocean

After turning around the Cape of Good Hope, Nova sailed into the South Atlantic and discovered the uninhabited island of Saint Helena while he was returning home. It is believed that the island was named after St. Helen. By tradition the date is the feast day of the saint on May 21. Jan Huyghen van Linschoten in a 2015 paper says that the date is a mistakenly quoted Protestant feast day for a discovery made two decades before the Reformation, instead suggesting May 3 as the more likely date, the feast day of the True Cross. According to legend, Nova anchored on the western side of the island and built a timber chapel at the location of the future Jamestown, Saint Helena. The island became a routine staging post on future Portuguese expeditions to India, but its existence and location was a Portuguese secret for the next eighty years until English captain Thomas Cavendish stumbled upon it in 1588.

Nova's Third Armada arrived in Lisbon on September 11, 1502. According to the letters by Italian merchants in Lisbon, the Third Armada brought back 900 cantari (quintals) of black pepper, 550 of cinnamon, 30 of ginger, 25 of lac, and other assorted goods. The amount of cinnamon has been cited as evidence of the theory that the armada visited Ceylon, but cinnamon was not rare in other Indian markets. Some of the cinnamon may have come from the cargoes of seized vessels.

== Aftermath ==
The expedition of the Third Armada was not considered a resounding success. Although there was no significant loss of ships or men, the armada came back with fewer spices than had been anticipated; letters insinuate that the cargo holds were partially empty. Nova also failed to trade for gold in Africa. The report of the cash constraint in India and the armada's reliance on piracy to fill its holds disheartened Portuguese merchants, who had previously thought that they could make easy profits on both legs of the India run. In contrast, the discovery of Ascension Island and Saint Helena was well received. The armada arrived too late to supply information from the journey to Gama's heavily armed 4th India Armada, which had already left Lisbon.

== Revision of island discoveries ==
By long tradition Saint Helena was sighted on 21 May 1502 by the four ships of the 3rd Portuguese Armada commanded by João da Nova during the return voyage to Lisbon, and that he named it Santa Helena after Saint Helena of Constantinople. This tradition has been reviewed by a 2022 paper which concluded the Portuguese chronicles published at least 50 years later, are the sole primary source to the discovery. Although contradictory in describing other events, these chronicles almost unanimously claim João da Nova found Saint Helena sometime in 1502, although none quote the precise date.

However, there are several reasons for doubting da Nova made this discovery. First, given that da Nova either returned on 11 September or 13 September 1502 it is usually assumed the Cantino planisphere completed by the following November includes his discovery of Ascension Island (shown as an archipelago with one of six islands marked as "ilha achada e chamada Ascenssam"), yet this map fails to show Saint Helena. Second, when a section of the Fourth Armada under the command of Estêvão da Gama sighted and landed at Saint Helena the following year on 30 July 1503 its scrivener Thomé Lopes regarded it as an unknown island yet named Ascension as one of five reference points to the new island's location. On 12 July 1502, nearly three weeks before reaching Saint Helena, Lopes described how Estêvão da Gama's ships met up with a section of the Fifth Armada led by Afonso de Albuquerque off the Cape of Good Hope. The latter left Lisbon about six months after João da Nova's return so Albuquerque and his captains should all have known whether João da Nova had indeed found Saint Helena. An anonymous Flemish traveler on one of da Gama's ships reporting that bread and victuals were running short by the time they reached the Cape, so from da Gama's perspective there was a pressing need that he be told water and meat could be found at Saint Helena. The fact that nothing seems to have been said about the island, da Gama's scrivener Lopes regarding the island as unknown, again implies da Nova found Ascension but not Saint Helena. The 2022 paper also reviews cartographic evidence that Saint Helena and Ascension were known to the Spanish in 1500, before either João da Nova or Estêvão da Gama sailed for India. The suggestion that João da Nova discovered Tristan da Cunha naming it Saint Helena is discounted.

If João da Nova indeed found Saint Helena, a separate 2015 paper has reviewed another tradition that he did so on 21 May 1502. This date appears to have first been suggested by Jan Huyghen van Linschoten in a book published in Holland in 1596. This described how his ships left Saint Helena on 21 May 1589, this being both the feast of Saint Helena and Whitsunday. At first sight, this statement seems to be a contradiction - the Roman Catholic Church certainly celebrated Whitsunday that day but their feast-day of Saint Helena was on 18 August. Linschoten's statement did not fit in with the Eastern Orthodox Church either - this faith certainly marked Saint Helena on 21 May but in 1589 celebrated Whitsun a week later, on 28 May. The paper suggested the solution to this apparent paradox was that by the time his book was published in 1596 Linschoten had converted to the Protestant Dutch Reformed Church. This faith celebrated Whitsunday on the same day as Catholics while Saint Helena was marked on 21 May, the same day as the Orthodox Church. Quite apart from the fact that the discoverers were Catholics, Linschoten failed to realise the impossibility that the island was named after a Protestant feast-day, it being found more than a decade before the Reformation and start of Protestantism. An alternative discovery date of 3 May on the Catholic feast-day celebrating the finding of the True Cross by Saint Helena in Jerusalem, as quoted by Odoardo Duarte Lopes in 1591 and by Sir Thomas Herbert in 1638, is suggested as historically more credible than the Protestant date of 21 May. The paper observes that if da Nova made the discovery on 3 May 1502, he may have been inhibited from naming the island Ilha de Vera Cruz (Island of the True Cross) because Pedro Álvares Cabral had already assigned that same name to the Brazilian coastline, which he thought to be a large island, on 3 May 1500. News of Cabral's discovery reached Lisbon directly from South America before da Nova's fleet set off on the voyage to India in 1501. If da Nova knew the True Cross name had already been assigned, the most obvious and plausible alternative name for him to give the island was "Santa Helena".

The long tradition that João da Nova built a chapel from one of his wrecked carracks has been shown to be based on a misreading of the records.

== See also ==
- First Luso-Malabarese War

== Sources ==
Chronicles

- João de Barros (1552) Décadas da Ásia: Dos feitos, que os Portuguezes fizeram no descubrimento, e conquista, dos mares, e terras do Oriente., 1777–78 ed. Da Ásia de João de Barros e Diogo do Couto, Lisbon: Régia Officina Typografica. Vol. 1 (Dec I, Lib.1–5),
- Diogo do Couto "De todas as Armadas que os Reys de Portugal mandáram à Índia, até que El-Rey D. Filippe succedeo nestes Reynos", de 1497 a 1581", in J. de Barros and D. de Couto, Décadas da Ásia Dec. X, Pt.1, Bk.1, c.16
- Fernão Lopes de Castanheda (1551–1560) História do descobrimento & conquista da Índia pelos portugueses (1833 edition, Lisbon: Typ. Rollandiana v.1
- Gaspar Correia (c. 1550s) Lendas da Índia, first pub. 1858-64, Lisbon: Academia Real de Sciencias Vol 1.
- Damião de Góis (1566–67) Chrónica do Felicíssimo Rei D. Manuel, da Gloriosa Memoria, Ha qual por mandado do Serenissimo Principe, ho Infante Dom Henrique seu Filho, ho Cardeal de Portugal, do Titulo dos Santos Quatro Coroados, Damiam de Goes collegio & compoz de novo. (As reprinted in 1749, Lisbon: M. Manescal da Costa) Online
- Relação das Náos e Armadas da India com os Sucessos dellas que se puderam Saber, para Noticia e Instructção dos Curiozos, e Amantes da Historia da India (Codex Add. 20902 of the British Library), [D. António de Ataíde, orig. editor.] Transcribed and reprinted in 1985, by M.H. Maldonado, Biblioteca Geral da Universidade de Coimbra. Online

Secondary

- Birch, W. de G. (1877) "Introduction" to translation of Afonso de Albuquerque (1557) The Commentaries of the great Afonso Dalboquerque, second viceroy of India, 4 volumes, London: Hakluyt Society
- Dames, M.L. (1918) "Introduction" in An Account Of The Countries Bordering On The Indian Ocean And Their Inhabitants, Vol. 1 (Engl. transl. of Livro de Duarte de Barbosa), 2005 reprint, New Delhi: Asian Education Services.
- Bouchon, G. (1980) "A propos de l'inscription de Colombo (1501): quelques observations sur le premier voyage de João da Nova dans l'Océan Indien", Revista da Universidade de Coimbra, Vol. 28, p. 233-70. Offprint.
- Danvers, Frederic Charles (1894) The Portuguese in India, being a history of the rise and decline of their eastern empire. Vol. 1 (1498–1571) London: Allen.
- Diffie, B. W., and G. D. Winius (1977) Foundations of the Portuguese empire, 1415–1580, Minneapolis, MN: University of Minnesota Press
- Leite, Duarte (1960) História dos Descobrimentos, Vol. II Lisbon: Edições Cosmos
- Mathew, K.S. (1997) "Indian Naval Encounters with the Portuguese: Strengths and weaknesses", in K.K.N. Kurup, editor, India's Naval Traditions, New Delhi: Northern Book Centre.
- Monteiro, Saturnino (1989) Batalhas e combates da Marinha Portuguesa: 1139–1521 Lisbon: Livraria Sá da Costa
- Quintella, Ignaco da Costa (1839) Annaes da Marinha Portugueza, v.1. Lisbon: Academia Real das Sciencias.
- Radulet, Carmen M. (1985) "Girolamo Sergini e a Importância Económica do Oriente", Revista da Universidade de Coimbra, Vol. 32, p. 67–77. Offprint.
- Report (1899) "Antiquarian Discovery Relating to the Portuguese in Ceylon", Journal of the Ceylon Branch of the Royal Asiatic Society, Vol. 16, p. 15–29 Online
- Roukema, E. (1963) "Brazil in the Cantino Map", Imago Mundi, Vol. 17, p. 7–26
- Subrahmanyam, S. (1997) The Career and Legend of Vasco da Gama. Cambridge, UK: Cambridge University Press.
- Smallman, D.K. (2003) Quincentenary: A Story of St Helena,1502–2002. Pezance, UK: Patten.

Preceded by 2nd Armada (Pedro Álvares Cabral, 1500)	Portuguese India Armada; 3rd Armada (1501)	Succeeded by 4th Armada (Vasco da Gama, 1502)
