= Thomé Lopes =

Thomé Lopes (sometimes modernized as Tomé Lopes) was a Portuguese scrivener, writer of an eyewitness account of the second journey of Vasco da Gama to India (1502–1503).

Thomé Lopes's background is obscure. All that is known is that he was a native of Porto, Portugal.

In early 1502, Thomé Lopes was hired as a escrivão (captain's clerk) aboard an unnamed ship owned and outfitted by Ruy Mendes de Brito (a gentleman of the royal chamber of King Manuel I of Portugal) and captained by an Italian, Giovanni Buonagratia (João de Buonagracia) of Florence. This ship was part of a Portuguese squadron of five ships, under the overall command of Estêvão da Gama (cousin of Vasco da Gama). This squadron set out from Lisbon on 1 April 1502, intending to catch up and join the 4th Portuguese India Armada of admiral Vasco da Gama, which had left a few months earlier (February 1502). According to Lopes, their squadron caught up with the main armada on 21 August 1502 at Anjediva Island, off the Malabar Coast of India.

Among the most memorable passages in Lopes's account, is a detailed description of the notorious massacre of the Muslim pilgrim ships (3 October 1502, a day "that I remember every day of my life") on the orders of Vasco da Gama. Later Portuguese chroniclers have dealt uneasily with this act of cruelty, but Lopes's vivid and often heart-breaking narrative leaves little unmentioned.

Another famous episode reported by Lopes is the execution by impaling of three Muslims in Cochin, on the orders of the Trimumpara Raja, the Hindu prince of Cochin, for the sacrilege of selling a cow for beef to the crew of a Portuguese ship in harbor. It is notable that it was admiral Vasco da Gama himself (not usually known for his cultural sensitivity) who arrested the three men and handed them over to the Cochinese authorities for justice, and forbade any further purchases of cows by Portuguese sailors.

Lopes and the armada left India in February 1503, beginning its return journey back to Portugal. Lopes reports how his ship was nearly sunk in a collision with another off Mozambique Island. Somewhere around the Cape of Good Hope in July, Lopes reports an encounter with two of the ships of the outgoing 5th Armada of Afonso de Albuquerque.

On 30 July 1503 Thomé Lopes's ship, accompanied by two others, came across and landed on the South Atlantic island of Saint Helena. Lopes refers to it as an unknown island, and gives its position relative to Ascension Island (which he refers to by that name). It is commonly accepted that Ascension Island was first discovered in May 1501 on the outward journey of João da Nova, and some writers have questioned how Lopes could have known about that island as he left Lisbon before Nova's fleet returned. A clue is given in Lopes's own account, where he describes how, in August 1502, they picked up letters in Malindi left by the returning João da Nova. These letters might have described Nova's discovery of Ascension Island on the outward journey (although not, of course, Nova's own discovery of Saint Helena on his return in May 1502). The only quibble remains with Lopes's use of the name "Ascension" island, as it is commonly thought Nova originally named it Conceição (Conception island), and it was only renamed "Ascension" later (May 1503) by Afonso de Albuquerque. One possible explanation is that Lopes's account might not have been written immediately in 1502, but a little later after his arrival in Portugal, after the name of Ascension Island had already been settled upon. But the most probable explanation is simply that the name (and maybe even the locational information) was reported to Thomé Lopes precisely by the two 5th Armada ships that, as already mentioned, Lopes had just encountered near the Cape of Good Hope (the two would have been coming precisely from Albuquerque's (re-)discovery of Ascension Island).

The original Portuguese version of Thomé Lopes's account has been lost, but an Italian translation was published in 1550 in Venice, in a collection of travelogues collected by Giovanni Battista Ramusio. A translation back to Portuguese was commissioned and published in 1812.

Thomé Lopes's account is one of several eyewitness account of the 4th Portuguese India Armada of 1502–03. It is widely regarded as reliable, and frequently resorted to by historians to correct the accounts by later 16th-century chroniclers (João de Barros, Gaspar Correia, etc.)

== See also ==
- 4th Portuguese India Armada (Gama, 1502)
