= Esmeralda (carrack) =

1503 shipwreck in Europe's Age of Discovery

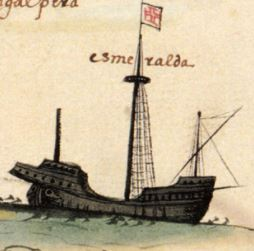
Esmeralda, depicted in Livro das Armadas dá ındia, c. 1568

Esmeralda was a Portuguese carrack (Portuguese: nau) that sank in May 1503 off the coast of Oman as part of Vasco da Gama's 1502 Armada to India while commanded by da Gama's maternal uncle Vicente Sodré. First relocated in 1998 and excavated by David Mearns in 2013–15, is the earliest ship found, as of 2016, from Europe's Age of Discovery.

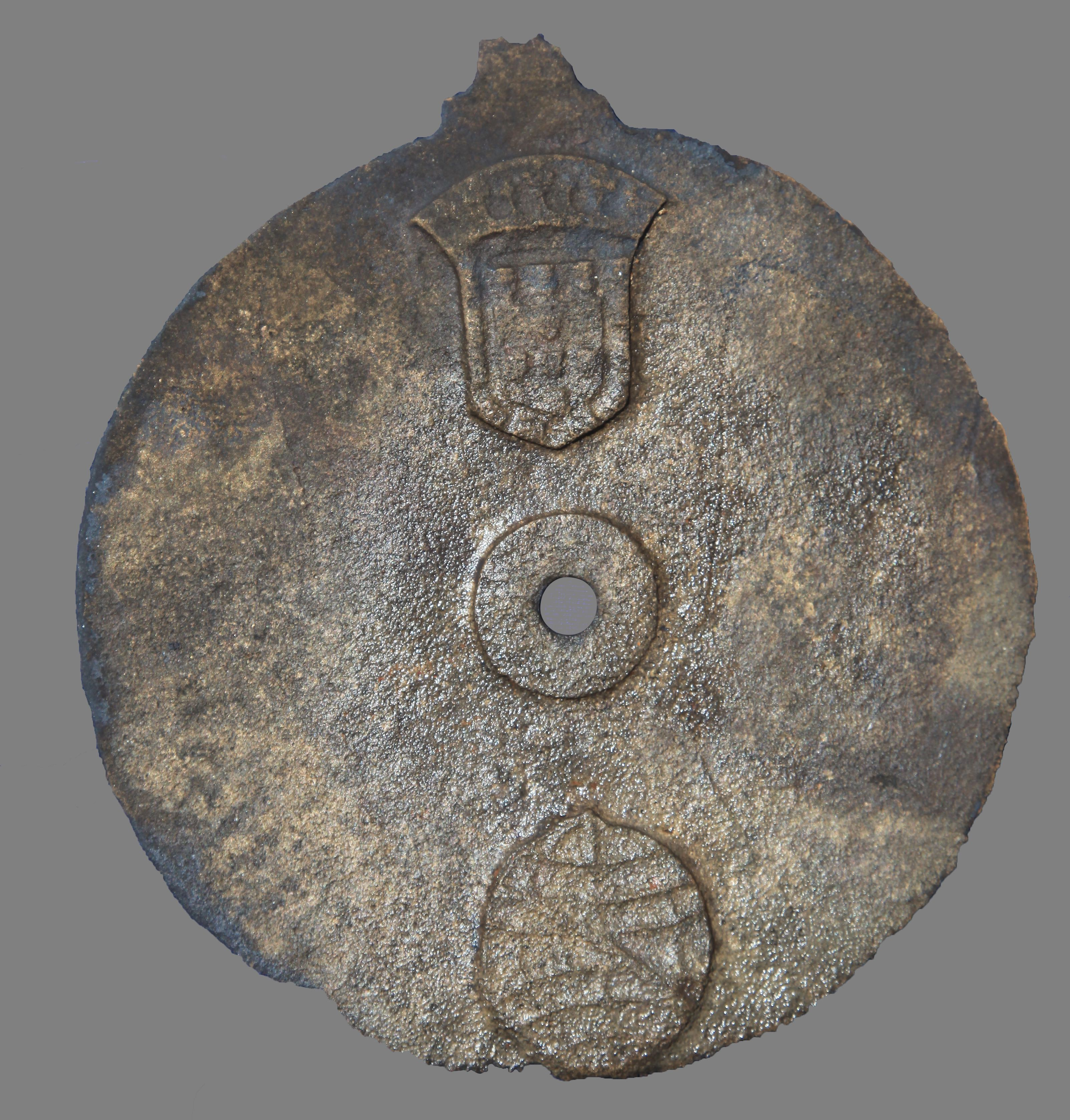
An astrolabe recovered from Esmeralda's wreck; National Museum of Oman, 2016 photo

Items recovered from the wreck site include the earliest known mariner's astrolabe believed to have been made between 1496 and 1501 and a ship's bell dated 1498.

== See also ==
- 4th Portuguese India Armada
