= 4th Portuguese India Armada (Gama, 1502) =

Expedition commanded by Vasco da Gama

The 4th Portuguese India Armada was a Portuguese fleet that sailed from Lisbon in February, 1502. Assembled on the order of King Manuel I of Portugal and placed under the command of Vasco da Gama, it was the fourth of some thirteen Portuguese India Armadas, was Gama's second trip to India, and was designed as a punitive expedition targeting Calicut to avenge the numerous defeats of the 2nd Armada two years earlier.

Along the way, in East Africa, the 4th Armada established a Portuguese factory in present-day Mozambique, made contact and opened trade with the gold entrepot of Sofala and extorted tribute from Kilwa. Once in India, the armada set about attacking Calicut shipping and disrupting trade along much of the Malabar Coast. But the ruling Zamorin of Calicut refused to accede to Portuguese demands, arguing that the violent exactions of the armada exceeded any claims they might have for compensation. The 4th Armada left without bringing the Zamorin to terms and leaving matters unresolved. Before departing, the armada established a crown factory in Cannanore and left behind a small patrol under Vicente Sodré, the first permanent Portuguese fleet in the Indian Ocean.

== Background ==
The Second India Armada, commanded by Pedro Álvares Cabral, had arrived in Portugal in the summer of 1501 in a terrible shape. Ship and human losses were tremendous, its mission objectives failed. They had failed to establish a factory in Sofala, the outlet of the Monomatapa gold trade in East Africa, and, more worrisomely, opened hostilities with the city-state of Calicut (Calecute, Kozhikode), the principal commercial entrepôt of the Kerala spice trade and dominant city-state on the Malabar coast of India.

By the time this news was received, the 3rd India Armada under João da Nova had already departed, a commercial expedition unequipped to deal with the hostile turn of events in the Indian Ocean.

As a result, King Manuel I of Portugal ordered a new fleet to be assembled, the 4th India Armada, armed to the teeth, with the explicit objective of bringing Calicut to heel.

== Appointment of Gama ==
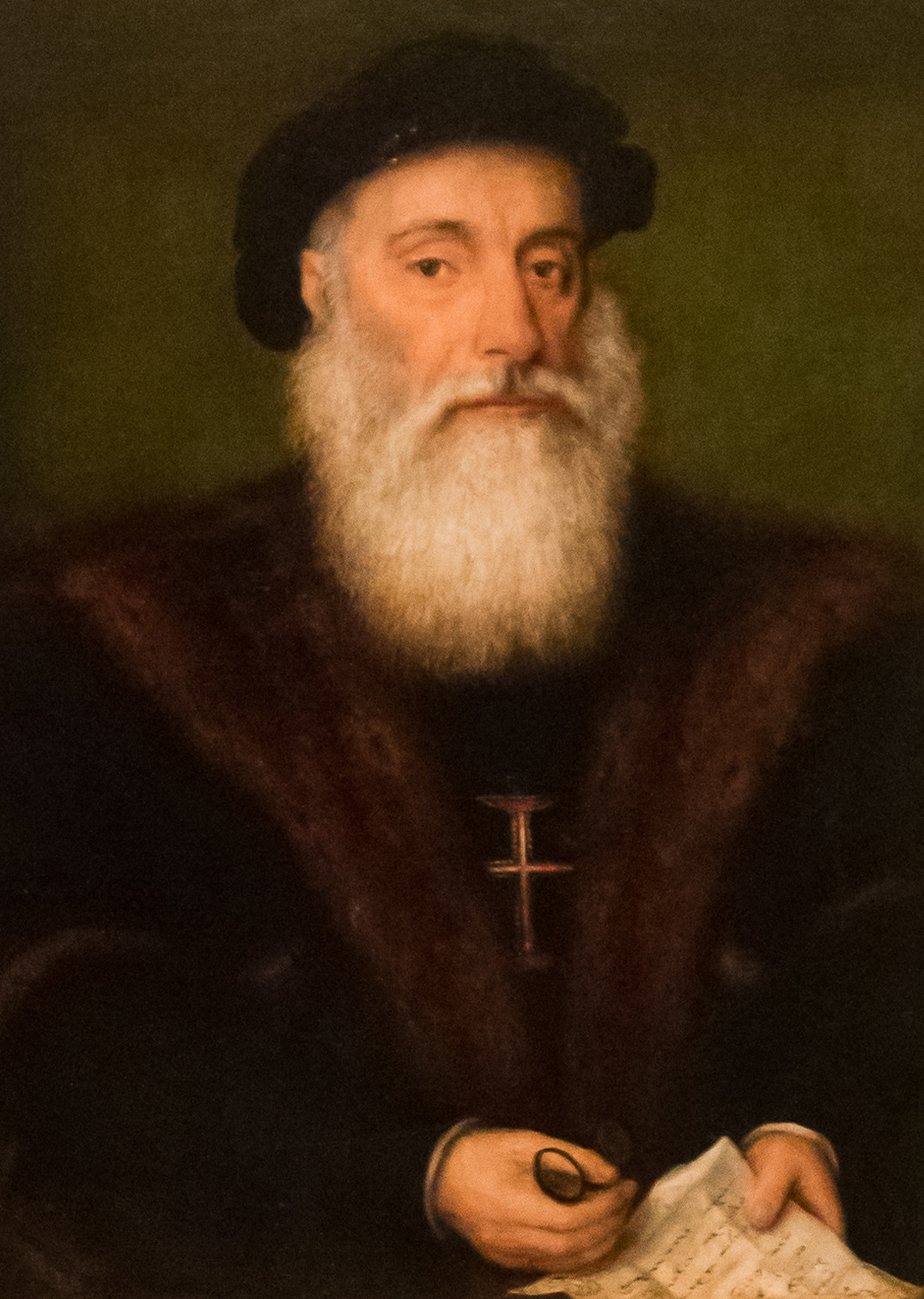
Vasco da Gama

The command of the 4th Armada was offered to Pedro Álvares Cabral. But various factions in the Portuguese court and the Casa da India, opposed Cabral's appointment, on the grounds that it was Cabral's 'incompetence' that had created this unhappy situation to begin with. However, Cabral had his own political supporters that could not be ignored. The king tried to compromise by offering Cabral the position of captain-major (capitão-mor), but letting it be clearly understood that his command of the fleet would not be absolute, that at least one squadron would be placed under the separate command of Vicente Sodré (an uncle of Vasco da Gama, and leading opponent of Cabral). Finding this condition an unacceptable affront, Cabral withdrew his name in a huff. Manuel I immediately appointed Vasco da Gama himself as captain-major.

The intrigues behind the appointment have been variously told. By some accounts, the initial offer to Cabral was a pro forma gesture to palliate his faction rather than an earnest offer. In other words, the king never had any intention of letting Cabral lead the expedition, that the onerous conditions were introduced knowing Cabral would find them unacceptable. That these conditions were only revealed at the last minute, just before the fleet's departure, lends credence to the theory, i.e. the monarch did not want to give Cabral time to reconsider or allow opposition to mount against Gama's rapid appointment.

Chronicler Gaspar Correia tells a slightly different story – he does not mention Sodré's command, but rather relates how King Manuel I summoned Vasco da Gama a mere three days before the scheduled departure date and expressed his "disappointment and mistrust" of Cabral's "dubious fortune" at sea., but that he had made a promise to Cabral and could not break it. On this hint, Gama produced a royal letter (issued by Manuel back in 1500, and reiterated in October 1501), promising Gama a determining role in any future India expedition, and demanded command of the expedition for himself. The king was caught between two commitments – honoring the letter to Gama, or his appointment to Cabral. Hearing of the king's quandary, Cabral voluntarily withdrew his name to graciously allow Manuel I to honor his letter.

The 16th-century chroniclers seem to agree that King Manuel I wanted to deprive Cabral of command, and that the Sodré appointment and/or the Gama letter was just a ploy by the king to wiggle out of appointing Cabral. But some later authors have interpreted the accounts differently, that King Manuel I was wholly behind Cabral, but was forced to yield to the unsavory machinations of the Gama-Sodré family.

Just before his departure, in a solemn ceremony at the Lisbon Cathedral on January 30, 1502, King Manuel I bestowed upon Vasco da Gama the newly created title of Almirante dos mares de Arabia, Persia, India e de todo o Oriente ("Admiral of the Seas of Arabia, Persia, India and all the Orient") - an overwrought title reminiscent of the ornate Castilian title borne by Christopher Columbus. (Evidently, Manuel must have reckoned that if Castile had an 'Admiral of the Seas' running around, then surely Portugal should have one too.)

On a side note, this was the first India armada for which the vintena de Belém was introduced - that is, the 5% tax on profits of private trading by captains and officers of Portuguese India Armadas, earmarked for the construction and maintenance of the Jerónimos Monastery in the Belém district of Lisbon. The vintena would continue until 1522.

== The Fleet ==
The 4th Armada was composed of 20 ships and between 800 and 1800 men. The Armada was originally envisaged as two squadrons – 15 ships under the admiral to head to India, 5 under the vice-admiral designated to patrol the mouth of the Red Sea. As it turns out, not all ships were ready by the launch date, so the armada was re-arranged into three squadrons, the first two squadrons (10 under admiral Vasco da Gama, 5 under his uncle, vice-admiral Vicente Sodré) to head out at once, and the five remaining ships to go out a little while later as a third squadron under Gama's cousin, Estêvão da Gama, with instructions to catch up to the main fleet along the way.

The exact composition of the three squadrons differs in the various accounts. The following list of ships should not be regarded as authoritative, but a tentative list compiled from various conflicting accounts.

First Squadron (Vasco da Gama)	Second Squadron (Vicente Sodré)	Third Squadron (Estêvão da Gama)
10 ships (4 large "naus + 4 navetas (nta) + 2 caravels (cv))	5 ships (2 naus + 3 cvs)	5 ships (2 naus + 3 cvs)
1. São Jerónimo (Vasco da Gama)	11. Leitoa Nova/Esmeralda (Vicente Sodré or Fernão d'Atouguia?)	16. Flor de la Mar (Estevão da Gama)
2. Lionarda (D. Luís Coutinho)	12. São Paulo (Álvaro de Ataíde or Pêro de Ataíde 'Inferno')	17. Julia (Lopo Mendes de Vasconcellos)
3. São Miguel/Gabriel (Gil Matoso)	Fernão Rodrigues 'Bardaças', cv)	18. (Thomaz de Carmona/Cremona, cv) – Italian
4. Batecabello (Gil Fernandes de Sousa)	14. Estrella (António Fernandes Roxo, cv)	19. Ship of Bartolomeo Marchionni (Lopo Dias, cv)
5. São Rafael (Diogo Fernandes Correia, nta)	15. Garrida (Pêro Rafael or Brás Sodré, cv)	20. Ship of Rui Mendes de Brito (Giovanni Buonagrazia (João da Bonagracia, cv) – Italian
6. Santa Elena (Pedro Afonso de Aguiar, nta)
7. Bretoa (Francisco da Cunha 'Marecos', nta)
8. Vera Cruz (Rui de Castanheda/da Cunha, nta)
9. Fradeza (João Lopes Perestrello, cv)
10. Salta na Palha (António do Campo or Antão Vaz, cv)

This list of captains is principally based on João de Barros's Décadas, Damião de Gois's Chronica, Castanheda's História, the Relação das Náos, Couto's list, Faria e Sousa's Asia and Quintella's Annaes da Marinha. The list of ship names is from Gaspar Correia's Lendas da Índia. and should be suspected as unreliable. As usual, Correia's list of captains differs significantly from the others. In Correia, neither of the Sodré brothers command their own ships – indeed Correia asserts Vicente Sodré was carried as a passenger aboard Vasco da Gama's flagship, with the result that the lead ship of the second squadron was captained by a certain Fernão d'Atouguia (of the Ataíde family?) and the fifth ship by Pêro Rafael (a name that appears on several other lists). The anonymous lists of the Memorias das Armadas and Livro de Lisuarte de Abreu give their own variations. Doubtless, the captain lists are complicated by the fact that there were some rearrangements of the fleet in Africa and India, and captains were shuffled around – at some point, both Vicente and Brás Sodré was definitely given command of a ship of his own. The chronicles report that the fleet also carried pre-fabricated lumber and fittings with instructions to assemble a new caravel upon arrival in East Africa.

The 4th India Armada (1502) From Memorias das Armadas
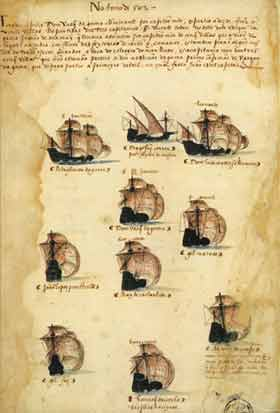
First squadron (Vasco da Gama)

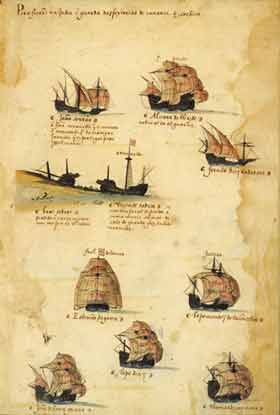
Second Squadron (Vicente Sodré) and Third Squadron (Estêvão da Gama)

The most famous ship in the 4th Armada was arguably the one commanded by Estevão da Gama, the Flor de la Mar (sometimes spelled as Frol de la Mar), a 400 tonne carrack (nau), the largest ship of that kind yet built. The exact sizes of the other large carracks – the flagship São Jerónimo, Lionarda and the Leitoa/Esmeralda are unknown, but also presumed to be quite sizeable (that is, 250t or greater). These large ships were designated to return with spice cargo back to Lisbon. The smaller naus(navetas, 80–120t) and caravels (40–80t), went out as armed fighting ships, to remain as naval patrol vessels in India if necessary.

The Gama clan dominated the fleet – Vasco da Gama, his cousin Estêvão da Gama and his uncles Vicente Sodré and Brás Sodré took the leadership positions. We have assumed Pêro de Ataíde, to be the same person nicknamed 'o Inferno' ('Hell'), a notable veteran captain of Cabral's Second Armada. But in some accounts, his name is given as 'Álvaro de Ataíde' a native of the Algarve, thus possibly Vasco da Gama's new brother-in-law (Gama had recently married Catarina de Ataíde in 1500 or 1501; she had a brother by that name). Lopo Mendes de Vasconcellos was a soon-to-be brother-in-law (betrothed to Teresa da Gama, Vasco's sister).

Among the remaining captains, the most significant was probably Dom Luís Coutinho, son of the Count of Marialva, a high nobleman of considerable rank in the Portuguese court. Diogo Fernandes Correia (archaically, Corrêa) was pre-designated by the Casa da India as the factor for Cochin (replacing the factor Gonçalo Gil Barbosa that Cabral had left there).

There was significant private participation in the fleet. Two ships went out under Italian captains – Tomásio da Cremona ('Thomas de Carmona') and Giovanni Buonagrazia ('João da Bonagracia') of Florence. Both were likely privately outfitted by Italian consortiums (although Buonagrazia's ship is identified as formally belonging to Ruy Mendes de Brito, a gentleman of the royal chamber, he might be a mere figurehead of an underlying foreign investment group) Lopo Dias is identified by Barros as an employee of D. Álvaro of Braganza, who had privately outfitted ships in earlier armadas in conjunction with the Marchionni consortium, so there is reason to presume Dias's ship was outfitted the same way. The Leitoa Nova is said to have been privately outfitted by the powerful nobleman Tristão da Cunha in conjunction with the mysterious Lisbon merchant-woman Catarina Dias de Aguiar Eyewitness accounts suggest three more ships were also privately outfitted.

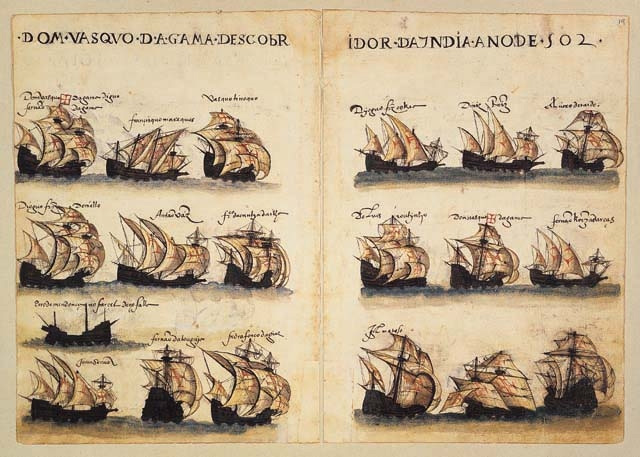
4th Armada of 1502 (from Livro de Lisuarte de Abreu)

Aboard the ships, as passengers, were Gaspar da Gama (the Goese Jew brought by Gama's first journey, who had also served as translator in the Cabral armada), an ambassador from the Kolathiri Raja of Cannanore and one of two noble Cochinese hostages taken inadvertently by Cabral's Second India Armada back to Lisbon (the other Cochinese hostage elected to stay in Lisbon, dispatching a letter to Trimumpara Raja, prince of Cochin relating the useful role he might serve Cochin by remaining behind in the Portuguese court.)

There were two Italian passengers on the armada – both military engineers, and probably secret Venetian agents – that would play a sinister role in India. They were known by their Portuguese names as João Maria (Gianmaria) and Pêro António (Pierantonio).

The 4th Armada is unusually blessed with multiple eyewitness accounts to supplement the standard chronicles: (1) an account by an anonymous Flemish sailor aboard the Leitoa Nova in the second squadron, (2) an account by anonymous Portuguese sailor; (3) a brief account by an anonymous German sailor; (4) a detailed account by Thomé Lopes, clerk of the ship of Giovanni Buonagrazia in the third squadron; (5) two letters dispatched from Mozambique in April 1503 by an Italian agent Matteo da Bergamo, who, by deduction, was travelling on T. Carmona's ship (6) letters dispatched from Lisbon by Italian agents Francesco Corbinelli and Giovanni Francesco Affaitati drawn from interviews with the newly returning crews in August 1503.

== The mission ==
The principal mission of the 4th Armada was to settle scores with the Zamorin of Calicut; The armada was to avenge the Zamorin's mistreatment of Cabral and the massacre of the Portuguese in the Calicut factory. As they did not have enough manpower to conquer Calicut outright, the armada planned to use their first squadron to set up a naval blockade in Calicut harbor, while the second squadron under Vicente Sodré would patrol the Gulf of Aden and cut off all further Arab shipping in the Red Sea. This would severely disrupt Calicut's trade and therefore its economic lifeline – a show of force to intimidate the Zamorin into compliance. The Armada would then demand that the Zamorin replace the damaged factory of the 2nd Armada, that he expel all Arabs from the Calicut region as punishment for their involvement in the aforementioned massacre, and that he sign a trade treaty regarding the supply of spice to Portugal.

Additionally, 4th Armada was instructed to open trade with the East African city-state of Sofala. Sofala had been secretly visited by the explorer Pêro da Covilhã during his overland expedition back in 1487, and he identified it as the end-point of the Monomatapa gold trade. The Portuguese crown had been eager to tap that gold source, but all prior armadas had failed to find it until Sancho de Tovar, commanding a ship of the 2nd India Armada, had finally located Sofala the previous year, but he only saw it from afar and did not go ashore. It seems that every ship in this armada was issued explicit royal instructions to try to trade for gold in Sofala.

== Outward Journey ==
February 10, 1502, Two squadrons of the 4th Armada – 10 ships under admiral Vasco da Gama and 5 ships under vice-admiral Vicente Sodré– set out from Lisbon.

Late February, 1502 – Fleet anchors in Senegal (either at Porto de Ale (Sali Portudal) or Bezeguiche (Bay of Dakar)) to take water. It is reported in one chronicle that Fernan d'Atouguia, captain of the Leitoa Nova falls ill and dies here. Gama transfers the experienced captain Pedro Afonso de Aguiar from the small nau Santa Elena to the large nau Leitoa Nova, and elevates one of his own companions, Pêro de Mendonça, to captain Aguiar's old ship.

Early March, 1502 – The 4th Armada sails southwest from Africa and may make a brief watering stop at Cape St. Augustine (Brazil), before heading across the south Atlantic towards the Cape of Good Hope.

April 1, 1502, The third squadron of the 4th Armada – five ships under Estêvão da Gama – finally sets out from Lisbon. Charting its own course, the third squadron will only catch up with the main body of the 4th Armada in India.

April–May, 1502 Violent storms at the Cape separates the fifteen ships of Vasco da Gama's fleet. Each captain is forced to figure out his own passage around the Cape, and make his own way towards the pre-arranged rendez-vous point on the other side.

May, 1502 After making watering stops in Madeira and Cape Verde, Estevão da Gama's third squadron reportedly spots an island in the south Atlantic. Uncertain which one – could be a Cape Verde island or the Penedo de São Pedro (islets off the Brazilian coast) or even as far as the islands of Trindade and Martim Vaz (further south), but does not stop to investigate. (By coincidence, that very same month, the returning Third Armada of João da Nova discovers the island of Saint Helena; despite the timing, the returning fleet will not encounter any of the ships of the outward armada. But they will pick up letters Nova left behind in Malindi, probably describing his outgoing journey and the latest news from India)

June 7, 1502 – The third squadron of Estevão da Gama is caught in a terrible storm around the Cape and splits into two groups – Estevão da Gama (Flor) and the ships of Lopo Dias and Thomaz de Carmona (with Bergamo on board) hold together as a trio, while Lopo Mendes de Vasconcellos (Julia) and the ship of Buonagrazia (with Lopes on board) form a separate pair.

=== Contact with Sofala, Factory in Mozambique ===
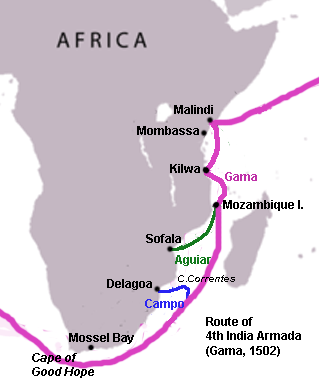
Approximate route of the 4th India Armada (1502) along the African coast, purple = route of main fleet (Vasco da Gama); green = side-trip of Pedro Afonso de Aguiar, blue = deviation of Antão Vaz do Campo

c. June 10, 1502 – Chronicles differ on what exactly happens after the first squadrons double the Cape. Following the account of Gaspar Correia (p. 272), Vasco da Gama was among the first ships to arrive in Mozambique Island, the pre-arranged meeting point. Gama is immediately recognized by the local sheikh (with whom Gama had a tussle on his first journey back in 1498). The Mozambique ruler immediately offers his pardon for that affair and puts supplies at the disposal of the tempest-tossed Portuguese. Vasco da Gama remains in Mozambique for a while, waiting for the rest of the battered fleet to trickle in, one by one.

The only known loss is the small nau Santa Elena, captained by the novice Pêro de Mendonça, which captured by bad currents around Cape Correntes, ends up running aground near the banks of Sofala. However the crew is safely rescued by the passing ships of Francisco da Cunha Mareco (Bretoa) and Fernão Rodrigues Bardaças (Santa Marta). With surfeit of crew from the capsized Santa Elena, Gama orders the construction of a whole new caravel from scratch on Mozambique Island.

Although not mentioned in all sources, the caravel of António do Campo ('Antão Vaz' in Correia), is said to have been badly battered at Cape Correntes, and drifted backwards into Delagoa Bay (Maputo). Campo will not rejoin the 4th Armada on time for the Indian Ocean crossing, and thus remain stuck in Africa until next year. See below.

According to Correia, while repairing on Mozambique Island, Vasco da Gama dispatches Pedro Afonso de Aguiar (captain of the Leitoa) and two caravels south to the city of Sofala, the entrepot of the Monomatapa gold trade. Sofala had been missed by all prior armadas, but not this time. Following up on the scout report of Sancho de Tovar from the previous year (see 2nd India Armada), Aguiar leads the first Portuguese ships into Sofala harbor. Aguiar goes ashore, initiates some trade in the local markets while seeking out the local ruler, the sultan or shiekh Isuf of Sofala (Yçuf in Barros; Çufe in Goes). An audience is arranged and Aguiar draws up a commercial and alliance treaty between Portugal and Sofala. Matters settled and gifts exchanged, Aguiar takes aboard a Sofalese ambassador to meet Vasco da Gama back in Mozambique.

In other accounts, (principally Osório (p. 192), mildly corroborated by other chroniclers and the anonymous Portuguese eyewitness and Matteo da Bergamo) it is Vasco da Gama himself, and not Aguiar, who goes to Sofala. According to this alternative account, Gama did not go to Mozambique immediately after the Cape crossing; rather, most of the fleet met at some unnamed bay just a few leagues north of Sofala (possibly the 'Rio dos Boms Sinaes'); Gama ordered Vicente Sodré with the main fleet ahead to Mozambique Island, while he remained behind The construction of the new caravel was thus overseen by Sodré, not Gama. After accounting for all the ships and sending them on to Mozambique, Vasco da Gama himself sailed south with four ships to Sofala, conducted some trade and opened the first contact with the Sofalese ruler. That would mean Gama was the last to arrive in Mozambique. In this alternative account, the lost ship of Mendonça (or Fernandes) was one of the four that went with Gama to Sofala, and capsized while exiting the Sofala banks.

Late June, 1502 – Vasco da Gama makes arrangements to leave Mozambique. A Portuguese factory is established on Mozambique Island, with Gonçalo Baixo as the factor, with some ten assistants, to capitalize on the results of the Sofala trade mission. The new caravel finished, Gama christens it Pomposa and places it, together with some 30 crew, under the command of João Serrão (of future Magellan fame), with instructions to take any goods from the Sofalese trade. According to Correia, Gama was unwilling to wait around for the results of Aguiar's mission to Sofala, and set sail out of Mozambique before Aguiar's returned from Sofala. As a result, Aguiar was forced to leave the Sofalese ambassador in Mozambique (letting him find his own way back home) and set sail for Malindi, hoping to catch Gama there.

=== Extortion of Kilwa ===
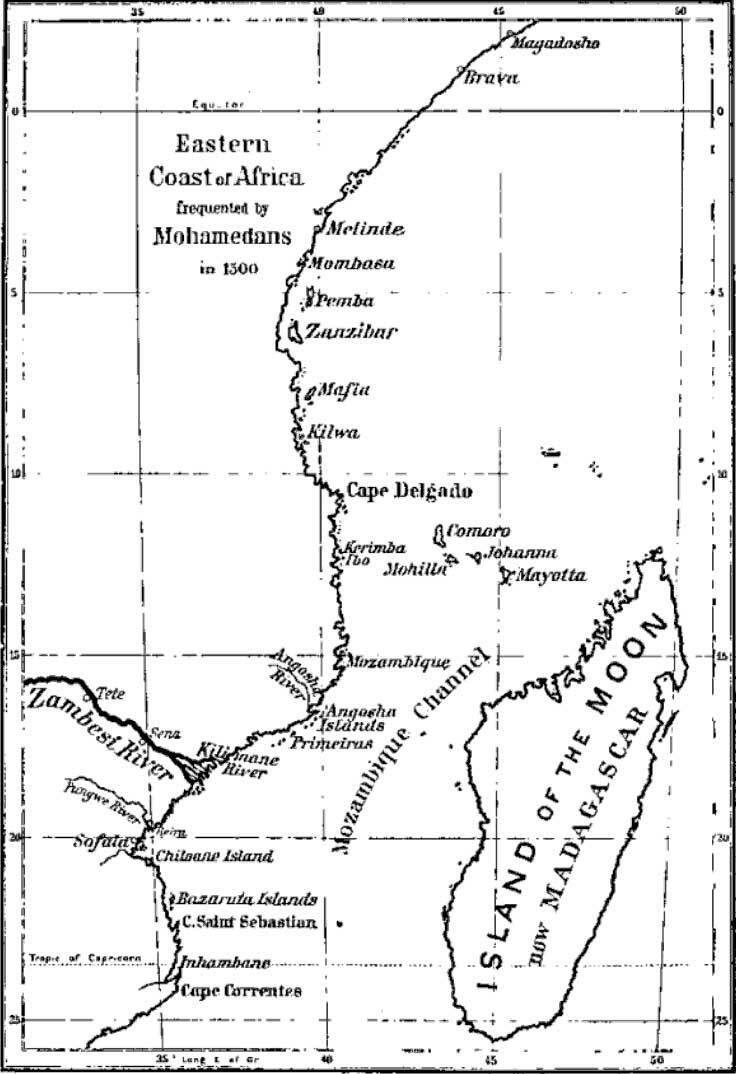
East Africa, c. 1500. The Kilwa Sultanate held formal sway from Malindi in the north, to Cape Correntes in the south.

Gama had gone first to Kilwa (Quiloa). The dominant city-state on the East African coast, Kilwa Sultanate was the formal overlord of Mozambique and Sofala. If the fledgling Portuguese trade presence in those East African towns was to remain unmolested, then the Portuguese must secure Kilwa's consent. Cabral and the 2nd Armada had tried, and failed, to secure a treaty with Kilwa back in 1500. Gama decided to try again – and was determined not to take no for answer. But, mindful of the lesson at Calicut, Gama also wanted to add a touch of intimidation, to show off his heavily armed fleet and impress upon the Sultan of Kilwa the consequences of interfering or turning back on any agreement.

On July 12, 1502, Gama's large, menacing armada arrived at the island-city of Kilwa. Gama sent for the Kilwa ruler, Emir Ibrahim, inviting him aboard the São Jeronimo, to negotiate a treaty of peace and trade.

Sensing a trap, Emir Ibrahim first asks for a safe-conduct (which da Gama promptly gives him), but fearing treachery, the emir changes his mind, and refuses to go aboard. However, after much discussion, one of his advisors, a certain wealthy nobleman Muhammad ibn Rukn ad Din (called Muhammad Arcone or Ancone or Enconij by the chroniclers) finally persuades the emir to take up the Portuguese offer. Emir Ibrahim is ferried to the flagship and climbs aboard. After minimal opening cordialities, and ostentatious proclamations of friendship, Gama lays down his price: a treaty with Portugal has to be paid for with a hefty cash tribute to the King of Portugal. The emir is dismayed. Declaring tribute to be a dishonor, he refuses. Gama threatens to level the city and lay it to fire and waste. Emir Ibrahim, effectively captive on board, reluctantly agrees, and signs a treaty making Kilwa tributary to Portugal. Leaving the Kilwan nobleman and advisor Muhammad Arcone aboard as a hostage, the emir returns to shore to make the arrangements.

mid-July, 1502 – After a few days of lingering in Kilwa harbor and no sign of the emir's promised tribute, Gama dispatches a messenger to see what the delay is. Emir Ibrahim sends a message back declining to dispatch the tribute, and telling the Portuguese captain-major that he can do whatever he will with the hostage Muhammad Arcone, given that his poor counsel had proven him unworthy. The angry Gama throws Arcone into a long-boat, without water or shade, to die of heat and exposure. Nonetheless, Muhammad Arcone is a wealthy man in his own right, and servants from his household offer Gama a substantial ransom to release him. Knowing the hostage is otherwise worthless to him, Gama consents.

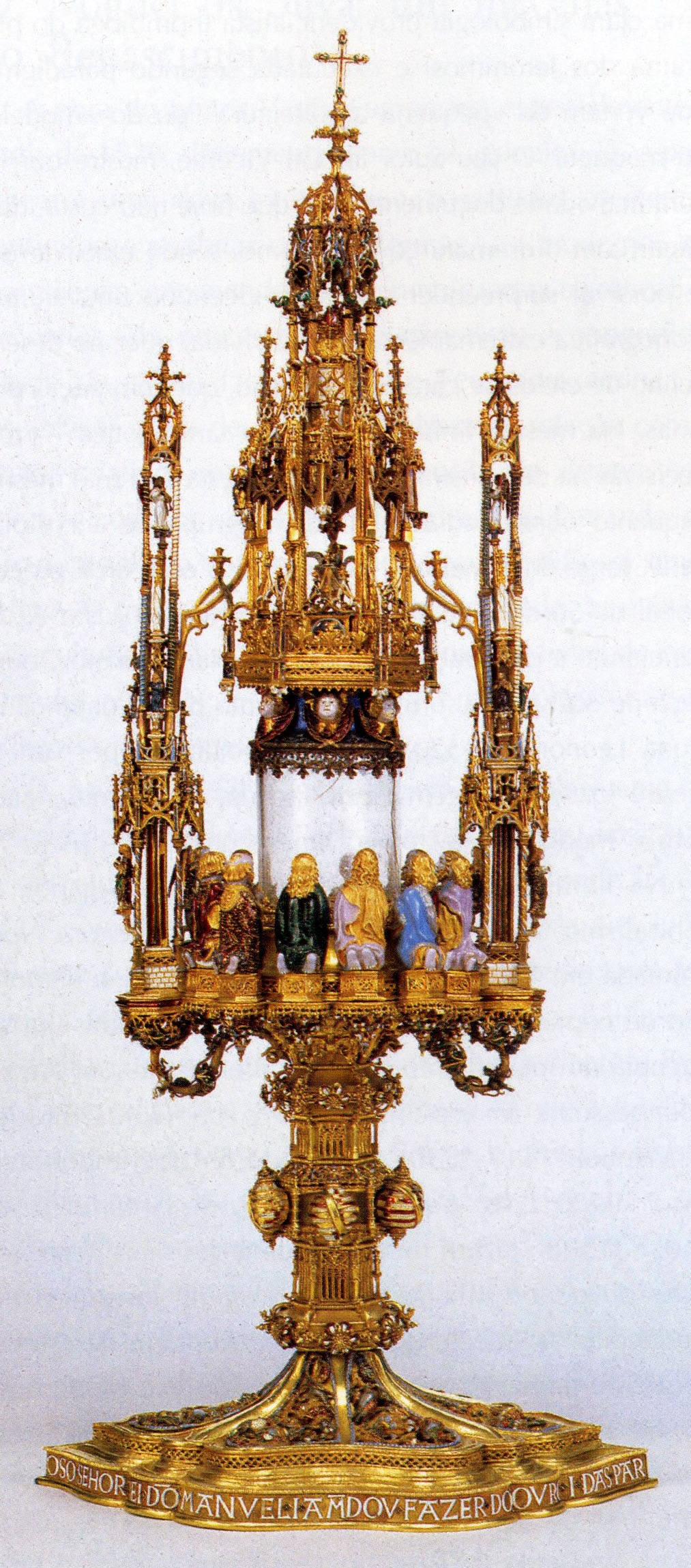
The Custódia de Belém, forged from Kilwa tribute

July 20, 1502 – His vengeance on Muhammad Arcone's bad counsel satisfied, the Emir Ibrahim of Kilwa finally decides to send some tribute – some 1500 gold meticals – to satisfy the Portuguese captain-major. Vasco da Gama, anxious not to miss the monsoon winds to India, takes what he can get.

[The extorted gold coins of Kilwa were used by the goldsmith Gil Vicente in 1506 to make the famous gold pyx or monstrance known as the Custódia de Belém, for the Jerónimos Monastery in Belém. It is considered by many to be one of the most magnificent treasure pieces of the Portuguese crown.]

[Correia (p. 282) reports a little knot before departing: several dozen Kilwan women 'picked up' (read: abducted) and taken aboard the ships by bored Portuguese sailors for fun and amusement refuse to return ashore. Although Emir Ibrahim promises that they will be unharmed, he cannot guarantee that those who allowed themselves to be baptized Christian by enthusiastic chaplains on the ships will be taken back by their families. Much to the delight of the crew, Gama reluctantly allows these to come with them.]

c. July 15, 1502, In the meantime, part of the third squadron, the trio that held with Estêvão da Gama (Gama, Dias, Carmona) arrive at Mozambique Island, half-famished and heavily damaged. At that same time, the remaining pair (Vasconcellos, Buonagrazia) alight at the Sofala banks. The two squads do not reconnect with each other. Estêvão da Gama's trio, following the itinerary left in Mozambique by his cousin, heads off to Kilwa Alone idling before Sofala, Vasconcellos and Buonagrazia proceed north to the mouth of the Rio de Bons Sinaes (Zambezi River), where they put in for repairs and recuperation.

On July 23, 1502, part of the third squad (Estêvão da Gama, Lopo Dias and Thomas de Carmona) arrived in Kilwa, just in time to reconnect the main armada of Vasco da Gama, preparing to depart from Kilwa harbor. At that moment (July 22 actually), the remaining two ships of the third squad (Vasconcellos, Buonagrazia) finally arrive in Mozambique Island. Taking note of the notes and itinerary left behind, they set sail for Malindi, hoping to catch the main fleet there.

Late July, 1502 – Vasco da Gama arrives in Malindi, just in time to be met by Pedro Afonso de Aguiar (from Sofala), who reports to him the results of the Sofala treaty. Gama's fleet does not actually dock in Malindi – they intended to, but miss it, landing a few leagues ahead, unable to turn back because of the weather (although they manage to get some supplies and exchange messages with Malindi emissaries that row out to them).

On July 29, 1502, Vasco da Gama's fleet departed its anchorage near Malindi for its Indian Ocean crossing. He was missing three ships: Campo, Vasconcelos and Buonagrazia.

August 2, 1502 – The remaining two ships of the third squadron (Lopo Mendes de Vasconcelos and Giovanni Buonagrazia) arrive in Malindi, just a few days after Gama's departure. They are well received by the Sultan of Malindi. They pick up a few letters left with degredado Luiz da Moura in Malindi by the returning fleet of João da Nova a few months earlier, reporting the latest Indian news. They do not stay long, but immediately set sail after Gama's fleet.

=== Campo in Delagoa Bay ===
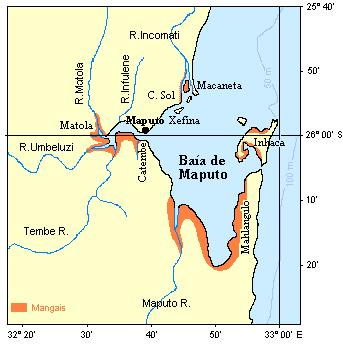
Delagoa Bay, now Maputo Bay

The last missing ship – António do Campo's caravel from the first squadron – will not make it across to India this year. As already alluded to earlier, the caravel of António do Campo ('Antão Vaz' in Correia) is said to have been caught up and battered by bad winds at Cape Correntes and forced to drift with the current of the Mozambique Channel aimlessly southwest. Campo's caravel is said to have alighted at Delagoa Bay (now Maputo Bay). The hitherto unknown capacious bay is watered by three rivers: the Maputo river to the south, the Espirito Santo 'river' to the west (actually an estuary formed by the Umbeluzi, Matola and Tembe rivers) and the Maniça (now Incomati) river to the north. Being told by the local inhabitants that the Espírito Santo 'river' was sourced from a great lake deep in the interior, Campo names it Rio da Lagoa (River of the Lagoon), from which we get the name by which Maputo Bay was long known: 'Delagoa Bay'.

Having been forced to linger at Delagoa for repairs, António do Campo hurries north to try to make junction with the rest of the 4th Armada at Malindi, but arrives too late (mid-September). The fleet having already left for India, and the monsoon winds preventing Campo's own crossing to India. António do Campo will remain behind on the East African coast until next April.

== Gama in India ==
mid-August, 1502 – After its Indian Ocean crossing, the 4th Armada alights near the opulent port of Dabul (north of Goa). These are the territorial waters of the powerful Muslim sultan Adil Shah (Hidalcão) of Bijapur. Expecting trouble, the fighting ships hoist up their lateen sails and load up their cannon. But no one comes out to challenge them, so they begin coasting south along the Indian coast towards Kerala.

=== Actions at Onor and Batecala ===
c. August 20, 1502 Gama's fleet reaches Anjediva island. The next day, the ships of Giovanni Buonagrazia (carrying Thomé Lopes) and Lopo Mendes de Vasconcellos (Juiloa) finally catch up with the rest of the armada. Save for the ship of Campo (still stuck in Africa) and Serrão (on patrol around the Mozambique factory), all the Portuguese fleet (18 ships out of the 20 that left Lisbon) are together and accounted for.

Around Anjediva island, the armada spots three boats belonging to Timoja, the Hindu privateer who operates out of Honnavar (Onor), on the frontline between the warring states of Muslim Bijapur and Hindu Vijayanagar. They give chase unto the mouth of the Sharavathi River, at which point the pirate boats slip into harbor of Onor. Assured by Gaspar da Gama (Goese Jew and translator) that Onor is a corsair's nest, Vasco da Gama orders an attack on the city. Portuguese landing crews attack the harbor, plundering and setting fire to the ships and docks.

The day after the raid on Onor, the 4th Armada arrives at the mouth of the river that leads up to the city of Bhatkal (Batecala), south of Onor. Perceiving what he considers hostile gestures from shore, the captain-major dispatches his cousin, Estêvão da Gama upriver to the town to investigate. Surveying the Batecala docks, Estêvão spies several Arab merchant ships and prepares for hostilities. But his attention is soon drawn to a small group of men in ornate robes, rushing down to the docks, frantically calling to him. It is an embassy from the raja of Batecala, requesting an immediate audience with the Portuguese captain-major.

Estêvão brings the embassy to his cousin. Evidently hearing of the fate of Onor, the embassy offers to submit to the Portuguese. Vasco da Gama agrees to leave Batecala in peace in return for a yearly tribute of 1,000 bags of plain rice and 500 bags of quality rice (probably Basmati). Batecala is also to agree to the exclusion of the Arab merchants from the city, that no pepper trade is to be carried at this port, and that no ship be allowed to travel between Batecala and Calicut. The treaty is set down in writing and signed.

[Batecala is described by Correia as just a modest rice, iron and sugar port south of Onor; it was actually the principal port and sea outlet of the Vijayanagara Empire, and its primary line was the horse trade, specifically, importing large numbers of splendid Persian and Arabian horses for the armies of Vijayanagara princes.]

=== Massacre of the pilgrim ship ===
Late August/Early September 1502 – Business in Batecala done, Vasco da Gama sets sail towards Cannanore. They anchor around Mount d'Eli, the common touch-point for ships on the Jedda-Calicut route, evidently intending to catch some prizes before proceeding.

September 29, 1502 – After prowling around Mt. d'Eli for nearly a month with little success (they captured only one minor ship), captain Gil Matoso (on the São Gabriel), spots a large merchant ship carrying Muslim pilgrims returning from Mecca (or going to it, chronicles contradict). The ship, the Miri, is identified as belonging to a certain al-Fanqi, one of the wealthier men of Calicut and said by some to be the Meccan factor in Calicut. Matoso chases the pilgrim ship down, which surrenders rather quickly, probably imagining that its master had enough money to ransom it off. But Vasco da Gama shrugs off all the offers. As the Portuguese crew plunder the ship and transfer its cargo, it quickly becomes evident that Gama intends to burn the ship with all its passengers – men, women and children – on board. When Gama proves deaf to their pleas for mercy, the passengers frantically attack the Portuguese men-at-arms with their bare hands, to no avail.

October 3, 1502 – a day, eyewitness Thomé Lopes states, "I will never forget for the rest of my days". The pilgrim ship thoroughly plundered, on Gama's orders, the passengers are locked in the hold and the ship burnt and sunk by artillery. It takes several days to finally go down completely. Portuguese soldiers row around the waters on longboats mercilessly spearing survivors.

The sinking of the Miri is an act that will instantly cement Gama's cruel and fearsome reputation, and generate a great deal of hatred for the Portuguese in India. Gama defended his act as "vengeance" for the Calicut massacre of 1500, arguing that the ship's owner, as a prominent person in Calicut, was 'doubtlessly' responsible for the sinister counsel to the Zamorin that led up to it.

Of the eyewitnesses, all mention it, but only Thomé Lopes openly condemns the act, claiming Gama acted "with great cruelty and without any mercy whatsoever". The chroniclers do not shy away from describing the event and their unease is evident. Although Barros and Castanheda reiterate Gama's justification of the act as revenge for Cabral, they do not seem to embrace it themselves. Indeed, Barros, Góis and Osório claim the ship belonged to the Sultan of Egypt, who was in no way responsible for the events in Calicut, thus subtly suggesting Gama may have made a mistake. Gaspar Correia is a little more open in his disapproval. He notes that several of the Portuguese captains were appalled by Gama's decision and tried to persuade him against it (if only because they would forego a hefty ransom). Correia gives a heart-rending account of the desperate and valiant resistance of the doomed passengers. Poet Luís de Camões passes over the incident in silence, evidently feeling it detrimental to the heroic portrait of Vasco da Gama.

Estimates of those killed on the Miri hover around 300. Portuguese chroniclers are eager to report that 20 children were spared this fate, and brought back by the 4th Armada to Lisbon, where they will be baptized and raised as friars at the Nossa Senhora de Belém. Among the eyewitnesses Thomé Lopes and the anonymous Flemish sailor make no mention of this small mercy, although Matteo de Bergamo does point it out.

=== Factory in Cannanore ===
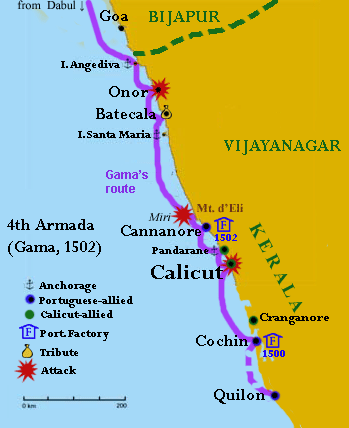
Malabar Coast of India, c. 1500, showing the path of Vasco da Gama's 4th India Armada in 1502

October 18, 1502 – Vasco da Gama's armada finally reaches Cannanore (Canonor, Kannur), and delivers the Cannanore ambassador that had gone to Lisbon with Cabral's 2nd Armada. The Kolathiri Raja of Cannanore invites Gama to come ashore for an elaborate reception, but Gama replies that he swore a personal oath not to set his foot on Indian soil again until his vengeance on Calicut was sated. As a result, the rajah orders a wooden scaffold to be built over the seashore, where they can meet in person without violating the vow.

Gama presents the raja with royal letters and munificent gifts (a jeweled sword, a brocaded armchair) and discussions immediately begin. A commercial treaty is negotiated, establishing a Portuguese crown factory in Cannanore, and arranging a fixed-price schedule, which the Raja personally guarantees, for the sale of spices to the Portuguese.

The negotiation for the commercial treaty did not go smoothly, particularly the fixed price clause. The Kolathiri Raja protested that he had no power over market prices nor the right to dictate how private merchants disposed of their property. Gama had to resort to feints, threats and then sailed out of Cannanore in anger. Barros credits the role of Paio Rodrigues, the Portuguese factor (private, not crown, an employee of the private employee of D. Álvaro of Braganza and the Marchionni consortium), that had been left behind in Cannanore by João da Nova's Third Armada at the beginning of the year. After Gama stormed off and ordered sail out of the city, Paio Rodrigues mediated between the Kolathiri Raja and the Captain-Major and finalized the treaty

Correia points out this is the treaty where the Portuguese cartaz system was first introduced. Henceforth, every merchant ship along the Malabar coast had to present a certificate signed by a Portuguese factor (in Cannanore, Cochin, etc.), or else be subject to attack and seizure by a Portuguese patrol. This licensing system would be subsequently adopted later on other Portuguese-controlled coasts (e.g. East Africa, Malacca, Brazil), with differing degrees of success. It will be largely maintained until the 18th century.

=== Bombardment of Calicut ===
October 25, 1502 – Fleet departs Cannanore. Chroniclers differ a little on the subsequent sequence of events. While still in Cannanore, Gama had sent Pedro Afonso de Aguiar to Calicut in advance, with the warning that he had come to settle scores for the mistreatment of Cabral and to get compensation for the overrunning of the Calicut factory in 1500. In response, the Zamorin of Calicut sent back a string of messengers to Cannanore (and along the way to Calicut), each delivering promises that the Zamorin was willing to settle matters with Gama, and compensate the Portuguese for the loss of their factory goods. On the other hand, Gama also receives a message from Gonçalo Gil Barbosa, the Portuguese crown factor in Cochin, warning him that it was all a tactical ruse, that the Zamorin of Calicut had also dispatched a circular letter to all the lords of the Malabar Coast instructing them to close their ports and markets to the Portuguese.

October 29, 1502 – Gama's large armada finally arrives before the harbor of Calicut (Calecute, Kozhikode). The Zamorin dispatches an emissary, a Brahmin (dressed as a Christian friar) on a boat to Gama. The Brahmin reports that the Zamorin had arrested twelve of those responsible for the 1500 riot, and offers a peace and friendship treaty and the opening of a discussion of the restoration of the trade goods seized from the Portuguese factory, albeit noting that the Zamorin has also suffered property damages from Portuguese actions and that he intends to deduct it from the final account. Gama is angered, feeling that the Zamorin has changed his tone from his earlier messages, and demands the property taken from the factory be restored in full and brought to his ship, and that all Muslim merchants must be expelled from the Calicut, before any discussion about a treaty begins.

While awaiting the Zamorin's reply, Gama seizes a nearby idling zambuq and some fishing boats that had unwisely ventured into Calicut harbor, taking some fifty fisherman captive. This action evidently angers the Zamorin, who sends a stern reply to Gama, noting that Gama had already taken severalfold times more property from Calicut ships, and slaughtered ten times more of his citizens (on the Miri, etc.) than the Portuguese lost in the 1500 riot. Despite being the net sufferer and the clamor of his citizens for revenge, the Zamorin is prepared to forgive and forget and start anew. The Zamorin also replies that Calicut is a free port and he has no intention of expelling 'the Moors'. Moreover, the Zamorin orders Gama to release his 'hostages', that he will not subject himself to negotiation conditions and that if Gama is unhappy with his offer, then he should leave Calicut harbor at once, for the Zamorin has not given him permission to anchor there, or at any other port in India.

October 31, 1502 – Infuriated by the reply, Gama sends out a strongly worded ultimatum, declaring that the Zamorin's permission means nothing to him, that he has until noon the next day to deliver the Portuguese factory goods to his ship. Gama uses this overnight interlude to send his boats out to sound the harbor of Calicut to find optimal firing positions. That same night, Calicut forces set about frantically digging entrenchments, erecting a protective timber palisade and laying cannon along the harbor shore.

November 1, 1502 – At noon, having received no reply, Gama orders that his Malabari prisoners be strung up by their necks from the shipmasts, allocating a few to each ship. Calicut crowds approach the beach to watch the grisly spectacle. Then the armada advances into the harbor and opens fire. The bombardment is principally aimed at clearing the beach and trenches. The Malabari shore cannons are too few, their range and power too weak, to provide an effective reply. The bombardment continues until nightfall. That night, the corpses of the hung Malabaris are taken from masts, their feet and hands severed off and sent by a small boat to the beach, with an insulting message to the Zamorin, including a demand that the Zamorin reimburse the Portuguese for the powder and shot expended on destroying his city.

November 2, 1502 – The city bombardment resumes the next morning. The mostly poor dwellings on the shore having been razed the previous day, the Portuguese cannons now have a clear view of central city and the statelier homes of the richer citizens of Calicut and bring their larger ordnance to bear. The city is relentlessly bombarded all morning – some 400 large rounds and an indeterminate number from the smaller caliber guns At noon, when the Portuguese pause for lunch, a small group of Malabari vessels tries to attack the idling squad, but are quickly seen off.

November 3, 1502 – Barros reports that the two-day bombardment had sufficiently crippled the city that several of the captains urge Gama to authorize a landing of troops to sack Calicut. But Gama, still hopeful the Zamorin might come to terms, turns down their request, believing a sack would only escalate matters to the point of no return. So, the next morning, vengeance satisfied, Gama sets sail out of Calicut harbor.

[In his somewhat different account, Gaspar Correia does not report the hanging of the prisoners; instead, after the bombardment, while still anchored before the harbor of the smoldering city, the 4th Armada captures a Coromandel merchant convoy of 2 large ships and 27 small boats unlucky enough to turn up at Calicut at that very moment. Seizing the convoy, Gama orders the cargoes transferred, the crews tied, their teeth beaten out, their noses and hands cut off and the ships set alight. The Brahmin emissary (still being held by the Portuguese) is sent back to shore with a bag full of severed hands and a note for the Zamorin telling him to "make a curry out of them".]

The violent treatment meted out by Vasco da Gama sends shockwaves throughout the Malabar coast. Merchant ships in Indian ports hurriedly leave the area or go into concealment. All shipping along the coast essentially freezes.

=== The Coastal Patrol ===
Before leaving Calicut, Gama assembles a squadron of five or six fighting ships under Vicente Sodré and his brother Brás Sodré, with some 200 soldiers (mainly crossbowmen), to maintain the blockade on Calicut harbor, and patrol the coast preying on Calicut shipping. The exact composition of the patrol squadron differs in the sources, and it seems there is some reshuffling of captains in the process. The following is only one possible list, compiled from different sources, and should not be taken as authoritative:

Captain	Ship	Notes
1. Vicente Sodré	São Rafael	naveta previously commanded by factor Diogo Fernandes Correia
2. Brás Sodré	Vera Cruz	naveta previously commanded by Rui da Castanheda
3. Pêro de Ataíde	Bretoa?	naveta previously commanded by Francisco da Cunha 'Marecos'?
4. Fernão Rodrigues Bardaças	Santa Marta	caravel
5. Pêro Rafael	Garrida	caravel
6. Diogo Pires	Fradeza	caravel previously commanded by João Lopes Perestrello

The patrol squadron captains are taken from the lists in Castanheda, Góis and Osório Other sources are not so explicit. The ship names are tentatively deduced from Gaspar Correia, who, as usual, deviates in naming the captains.

=== Cochin ===
November 3, 1502, His blockade of Calicut in place, Vasco da Gama arrives in Cochin (Cohim, Kochi) with the bulk of the armada. He is received by Trimumpara ruler of Cochin, not without a touch of anxiety. But cordialities soon set that to rest. The Nair hostage taken accidentally by the 2nd Armada the previous year is delivered, along with the letter of the other Nair who stayed back in Lisbon.

Gama concludes negotiates a new commercial treaty with the ruler of Cochin, this time with a fixed-price schedule, like at Cannanore. Diogo Fernandes Correia, the new designated factor for Cochin, relieves Cabral's factor Gonçalo Gil Barbosa (now slated to be transferred to Cannanore). They promptly set about their business of buying spices and loading ships in Cochin for the return journey.

While conducting business at Cochin, Vasco da Gama receives a letter from the queen-regent of Quilon (Coulão, Kollam), on behalf of her young son, the raja Govardhana Martanda. The queen invites the Portuguese fleet to load up with spices at Quilon. Gama declines politely, noting that he cannot do anything without the permission of his Cochinese hosts. As a result, the queen-regent dispatches a messenger to the prince of Cochin. Trimumpara Raja prevaricates at first, fearing that competition from Quilon's more amply supplied markets will hurt his own. But Cochin's slender supply is worrying the Portuguese factors. At length, an agreement is reached between all parties: Gama is to dispatch only two ships to load up with spices at Quilon, and promises not to set up a permanent factory in that city. The two ships, carrying temporary factor João de Sá Pereira, the first Portuguese to enter Quilon, will load up quickly, and return to Cochin within ten days.

November 19, 1502 – While at Cochin, Gama receives a message from Syrian Christian community of nearby Cranganore offering to place themselves under the protection of the King of Portugal. Gama accepts their gift of a red silver-tipped sceptre, a symbolic command staff, but notes that he personally cannot do much, as he will be leaving soon. But he promises that the community can call on the Portuguese naval patrol of Vicente Sodré at any time, should they need anything.

=== Ambush in Calicut harbor ===
January 3, 1503 – A wealthy Brahmin, accompanied by his son and nephew, shows up Cochin and requests permission from Vasco da Gama to take passage on the 4th Armada to Portugal. At first the Brahmin claims he seeks to learn more about Christian religion in Europe, but eventually reveals he is in fact a plenipotentiary ambassador of the Zamorin, and that he hopes to speak directly with King Manuel I of Portugal in Lisbon, and negotiate a permanent peace treaty between Portugal and Calicut, as (in the Zamorin's estimation) the Portuguese armada captains, coming and going every year, do not seem empowered to negotiate durable treaties. Gama assures him he is fully empowered by the king, at which point the Brahmin then offers to mediate a peace treaty between Gama and the Zamorin. Gama agrees, and the Brahmin returns to Calicut, coming back to Cochin shortly after accompanied by a Nair of the Zamorin's household, with a concrete offer to compensate the Portuguese for the goods lost in the Calicut factory. It seems a fair offer, so Gama decides to personally finalize the arrangement.

January 5, 1503 – Vasco da Gama takes his cousin's ship, the Frol de la Mar, plus one caravel, to carry the Brahmin and the Nair back to Calicut, to finalize the peace treaty with the Zamorin. Gama leaves the rest of the 4th Armada in Cochin under D. Luis Coutinho. (Rumors of the imminent peace with Calicut angers the merchants of Cochin, who feel they will be short-changed by any agreement with Calicut; Coutinho has a difficult time securing the continued purchasing and loading of spices).

Gama is taking only a light escort, but he imagines Vicente Sodré is in the vicinity and will provide additional security. However, as it happens, Vicente Sodré had left Calicut a few days earlier. He had been maintaining a continuous blockade on Calicut harbor, and engaging in repeated cat-and-mouse chases with small Calicut fishing ships that dared venture out. At one point, Sodré gave a couple of fishing boats chase into a side-channel, and sailed into a trap – forty armed Calicut paraus quickly surrounded him. A lucky cannon shot on the lead ship broke up the ambush, allowing Sodré to extricate himself from there quickly. He sailed out and raced back to Cannanore to pick up the rest of his patrol.

Gama arrives in Calicut harbor during this absence, unaware of any of this. Seeing no sign of Sodré, Gama orders the escort caravel to go towards Cannanore to find him. He anchors his own ship, the large Flor de la Mar, inside the harbor and lowers a skiff to take the Brahmin to shore, to meet the Zamorin and arrange for the delivery of the compensation payment, retaining the Brahmin's two relatives and the Nair on board as hostages. Three days are spent waiting, the Brahmin shuttling back and forth between the ship and the shore repeatedly to report and consult on the progress of the negotiations.

All seemed to be going well, but in the early morning hours of the fourth day, however, a hundred armed zambuks and paraus swarm into the harbor from the nearby channels and quickly surround the Flor de la Mar. The Flor's high sides do not allow the Portuguese to respond with artillery – the ship's cannons are mounted too high and the paraus are too close for an angle of shot, so the crew turns desperately to crossbows, musket fire and heaving rocks to keep them at bay. Days before the encounter, Gama had captured a large parau, which was now tied to the stern of the Flor. In the heat of the fighting, Malabari sappers row up to the tied parau, fill it with tinder, set it afire, and direct the flaming ship towards the Flor. Gama immediately orders the cables cut and the flames of the drifting parau only just miss them. Throughout all this, some of the Portuguese sailors are desperately trying to cut the cables on the anchor – a process that took time, as Gama had ordered it down with an iron chain. But eventually the anchor is cut, and the Flor begins to sail away. As distance is gained from the zambuks and paraus, the ship's cannons can now come into play and fire on the pursuers. The Flor reaches the mouth of the harbor just as Vicente Sodré arrives back from Cannanore with three caravels. Seeing the ambush is foiled, the Calicut boats turn around and slip back into the side-channels of the harbor.

It is a narrow escape. Before leaving Calicut, Gama orders the three hostages – the son & nephew of the Brahmin and the Nair – strung up by their necks on the main mast, in full view of the city of Calicut. He dispatches their corpses on a raft to the shore, pinned with a note swearing revenge on the Zamorin.

=== Naval Battle of Calicut ===
After the ambush, Gama, escorted by Sodré's patrol returns to Cochin. Although the Portuguese were aware that the Zamorin had ordered his Malabari vassals to assemble an armada in Calicut, Gama seems to have been confident that the coastal patrol was keeping a lid on it, perhaps not quite realizing that smaller ships throughout the region could make their way to Calicut unmolested via the Kerala backwaters.

Late January, 1503 – The Trimumpara Raja of Cochin adds some more disturbing intelligence: the Zamorin has hired the services of a Red Sea Arab privateer 'Cojambar' (Khoja Ambar), and several large ships have slipped past the Portuguese blockade and were now in Calicut, joining the fighting fleet under the command of Calicut admiral 'Coja Casem' (Khoja Kassein). The assembled Calicut fleet is estimated at 20 large ships, 40 gun-mounted sambuks (large dhows) and an innumerable number of smaller oar-powered paraus, carrying several thousand armed men. Although a large Calicut fleet had failed against the much smaller 3rd Armada of João da Nova the previous year, the Zamorin might have calculated that the addition of the large ships and more experienced captains might tip the balance – particularly against the heavily loaded and less-maneuverable large naus of the 4th Armada.

The Trimumpara Raja of Cochin urges Gama to avoid the fleet and just set sail for Portugal at once. But Vasco da Gama refuses to revise his plans. He needs to return to Cannanore to deposit the factor Barbosa there and pick up a cargo of ginger he had ordered. And he was itching for revenge for the ambush.

Early February, 1503, After a final audience with Raja Trimumpara, taking aboard his ambassador to the Lisbon court, leaving Diogo Fernandes Correia as factor in Cochin, and taking Cabral's old factor Gonçalo Gil Barbosa, to serve as factor in Cannanore, Gama's fleet (around ten fully laden ships) finally leaves Cochin. They are soon joined by Sodré's caravel squadron, and set sail warily towards Cannanore, guns ready for the Calicut ambush.

Gama and Sodré spot the Calicut fleet of Coja Casem and Arab privateer Cojambar, near the coast, out of Calicut harbor. In one of the first recorded instances of a naval line of battle, Gama's spice naus and escort caravels sail in a line end-to-end, concentrating all their immense firepower as they pass against the twenty large Arab ships of Cojambar, before they can get organized, sinking a number of them and doing immense damage to the remainder. Although the Arab squadron is out of commission too soon, Coja Casem nonetheless proceeds forward with his fleet of Malabari sambuks, hoping to use their speed to outmaneuver the guns of the heavy-laden naus and reach for the grapple. But Gama sends the escort caravels under Vicente Sodré to intercept them in their tracks, while the cargo naus hurry on toward Cannanore. Although the caravels are outnumbered, it is not much of a battle. The fight is essentially over when Pero Rafael and Gil Matoso quickly board and capture Coja Casem's flagship (oddly, found with a lot of women and children on board). The Calicut fleet breaks up and rushes back to port. The pursuing caravels capture a number of sambuks, which they proceed to tow and set on fire before Calicut. The long-prepared ambush has been foiled. Danger dispelled, the caravels proceed to Cannanore to make junction with the main fleet.

The Battle of Calicut, like the previous year's naval battle of Cannanore, once again demonstrated the critical importance of the technical superiority of Portuguese ships and naval artillery. But it also demonstrated to the Portuguese that the Zamorin of Calicut was not as easy to intimidate as they had expected. Despite the terror actions, the bombardment and the naval blockade, the Zamorin steadfastly refused to capitulate to Vasco da Gama's terms. On the contrary, the hiring of an Arab privateer fleet demonstrated a certain resourcefulness and willingness to continue fighting and take the fight to the Portuguese.

The hiring of Cojambar was also a foreboding. The Zamorin clearly understood he had to appeal to foreigners to help close the technical gap between Indian and Portuguese forces. Surely it would only be a matter of time before the Zamorin got his hands on Arab, Turkish and Venetian technology, and more substantial support from these great powers than just a Red Sea pirate or two?

If the battle of Calicut impressed something on Vasco da Gama, it was precisely that the Portuguese in India were living on borrowed time, that it was going to take more resources than he had to bring the Zamorin to heel and secure continued Portuguese access to the spice markets. And that was the message he would bring back to Lisbon.

In the meantime, his priority was to do everything he could to maintain the Portuguese toe in India - that is, to protect the Portuguese factories and Indian allies of Cochin and Cannanore, from the Zamorin's inevitable revenge the moment the 4th Armada left.

=== Return to Cannanore ===
Arriving in Cannanore, Gama leaves Cabral's old factor Gonçalo Gil Barbosa, and two assistants, Bastião Álvares and Diogo Nunes. With the permission of the Kolithiri Raja of Cannanore, Gama erects a small palisade around the factory. Some 200 armed men (others report merely 20) are to remain with the factory.

More troubling, however, is the India patrol squadron. Back in Lisbon, Vicente Sodré had been given a commission (regimento) by king Manuel I of Portugal instructing him to lead a patrol of five or six caravels in the Gulf of Aden, and prey on the rich Arab prizes going in and out of the Red Sea. But Vasco da Gama, realizing the vulnerability of Cochin and Cannanore, invokes rank as captain-major of the armada and orders Sodré to set that mission aside, and maintain his patrol on the Indian coast, to defend the Portuguese factories and their Indian allies against any reaction by the Zamorin.

== Return voyage ==
Late February, 1503 Vasco da Gama sets sail with his ten (or twelve) laden ships back to Lisbon. [Note: some chronicles put Gama's departure from Cannanore on December 28, 1502, meaning all the events described earlier must be compacted within that shorter time period.]

The return journey is quick and relatively smooth, with only one stop in Mozambique Island. It is caught in a slight storm around the Cape, where Estêvão da Gama's Flor da la Mar parts company from the rest. Estêvão da Gama, making his way back to Lisbon by himself, is said to have stumbled upon the South Atlantic islands of Saint Helena (already discovered the previous year by João da Nova's Third Armada).

Vasco da Gama's main fleet arrives in Lisbon in September, 1503. Gama delivers his report, noting his failure to bring the Zamorin of Calicut to terms, and urging the immediate outfitting of a strong fleet to establish strong permanent Portuguese garrisons to protect the allied cities of Cochin and Cannanore.

Gama arrives too late to affect the outfitting of the 5th Armada, which had already departed in April, 1503 under the command of Afonso de Albuquerque. But his recommendation will guide the formation of the next one, the 6th Armada, set to sail in the Spring of 1504 under the command of Lopo Soares de Albergaria.

== Aftermath ==
=== Fate of the Sodré patrol ===
March, 1503 – As soon as Vasco da Gama's 4th Armada leaves India, as predicted, Raja Trimumpara of Cochin receives intelligence that the Zamorin of Calicut is at this very moment preparing a landward invasion of Cochin. Portuguese factor Diogo Fernandes Correia urges Vicente Sodré to keep the caravel patrol squadron close to Cochin. But Vicente Sodré, eager for the easy plunder of the Arab Red Sea shipping, dismisses the rumors, Correia reminds him of Gama's orders, to no avail – Sodré pulls out his old royal regimento and orders the coastal patrol to follow him out to the Red Sea. It is said that at least two of the captains of the coastal patrol refuse Sodré's orders, and willingly surrender the command of their ships rather than disobey Gama's original orders.

The composition of the patrol that set out to the Red Sea varies in different accounts. One arrangement is that it was six ships: 1. Vicente Sodré, 2. Brás Sodré, 3. Pêro de Ataíde, 4. Pêro Rafael, 5. Diogo Pires, 6. Fernão Rodrigues Bardaças.

Vicente Sodré first sets out north to Gujarat, where it captures a great merchant ship off Chaul. The patrol then sails west into the Gulf of Aden, at the mouth of the Red Sea, to catch more prizes. About five Arab merchant ships are seized by the patrol there but, according to the account written later by Pêro de Ataíde, the Sodré brothers set about claiming a disproportionate share of the plunder for themselves, including embezzling the royal fifth. In Ataíde's account, Brás Sodré appears as the villain of the story. Already unhappy at the decision to abandon their comrades in India, the patrol captains quarreled with the Sodré brothers and nearly mutinied.

In late April, the patrol anchored in at Kuria Muria islands (off the coast of Oman). The local inhabitants warned them that a seasonal tempest was forming and that they had better move their ships to a safer shelter on the southern side of the island. Four patrol captains moved their ships accordingly, but Vicente Sodré and Brás Sodré refused (the ongoing quarrel over the spoils may have been a factor in this decision.) As the locals predicted, the tempest came, destroyed and sunk the ships of Vicente Sodré and Brás Sodré. Vicente went down with his ship, Brás survived to make it ashore, although he would die soon after in mysterious circumstances The wreck site of the ships was discovered in May 1998 by Blue Water Recoveries Ltd (BWR) and archaeologically excavated in a series of subsequent expeditions in the years 2013, 2014 and 2015 jointly conducted and managed by David L. Mearns of BWR and Oman's Ministry of Heritage and Culture. The findings and conclusions of the project were made public by the MHC in a press conference in Muscat on 15 March 2016, on the same date that a project specific website was launched and an interim report by Mearns, Parham and Frohlich was published in the International Journal of Nautical Archaeology.

In the aftermath, the four remaining ships of the coastal patrol, who elected of Pêro de Ataíde as their new commander, set back for India. However, contrary winds make it a difficult journey, and they inch back only painfully and slowly. The battered patrol hobbles into Angediva island sometime in the summer of 1503, where they are forced to stop to repair their crippled ships. Four days after arriving in Angediva, a fifth ship, the caravel of António do Campo (who having missed the previous year's monsoon, was forced to stay in East Africa throughout all this) arrives in Anjediva and joins the patrol. They are still repairing at Angediva when the ships of Francisco de Albuquerque and Nicolau Coelho, the vanguard of the 5th Armada, arrives in India in August, 1503.

=== First Siege of Cochin ===
April 1503 – Not long after the Sodré patrol departed for the Red Sea, the Zamorin of Calicut arrived with his 50,000-strong army at Repelim (Edapalli), on the boundaries of the Cochinese state. He demanded that the Raja Trimumpara of Cochin hand his Portuguese guests over to him. But Trimumpara refused and his son Narayan repels two Calicut assaults. By bribery and deceit, the Zamorin manages to detach a lot of Cochin's army, overwhelms the defenses and kills prince Narayan at a battle near the Edapalli ford. The Trimumpara Raja and his Portuguese guests (factor Diogo Fernandes Correia and his assistants), accompanied by a small loyal Nair guard, abandon Cochin city and flee across the harbor to Vypin, a barrier island of the Vembanad lagoon. Vypin's natural defenses and the deteriorating weather prevent the Zamorin from launching assault boats and seizing the island. Frustrated, the Zamorin burns down the city of Cochin. The siege will drag on for several months, until Francisco de Albuquerque, leading the remnant of the Sodré patrol, hurrying down from Angediva, arrived in Cochin in August–September, and forced the Calicut forces to withdraw.

Sometime during the course of this siege, the two Italian military engineers (and probable Venetian agents) that had come as passengers on Gama's ships - known only as João Maria (Gianmaria) and Pêro António (Pierantonio) – escaped Cochin and made their way to the Zamorin' camp, offering their services to the army of Calicut. The Italians would later teach Calicut to found large European guns and help close the technological gap between Indian and Portuguese artillery.

The Zamorin of Calicut, before burning down Cochin, removed an ancient sacred stone, upon which the ancient Kings of Malabar (see Chera Dynasty) were traditionally ceremonially esconsed as lords of the sea and overlords of all the Malabari states. The sacred stone had originally been housed at the ancient Malabari capital of Cranganore, but had since been moved to Cochin. The Zamorin now moved it once more, to Edapalli.

== See also ==
- Portuguese India Armadas
- First Luso-Malabarese War

== Sources ==
Primary accounts:

- [Anonymous Flemish sailor] Calcoen (Flemish account), first pub. 1504, Antwerp [English trans. in J.P. Berjeau, 1874], Calcoen, a Dutch narrative of the second voyage of Vasco da Gama to Calicut, printed at Antwerp circa 1504. London. online [Portuguese translation in A.C. Teixeira de Aragão, 1887, Vasco da Gama e a Vidigueira: um estudo historico. Lisbon: Sociedade de Geografia de Lisboa. online[French trans. in J. Denucé, 1931, Calcoen, récit flamand du second voyage de Vasco de Gama vers l'Inde, en 1502–1503]
- [Anonymous German sailor] account first pub. 1986 in M. Krasa, J. Polisensky and P. Ratkos, ed., European Expansion 1494–1519: the voyages of discovery in the Bratislava manuscript Lyc. 515/8. Prague: Charles University.
- [Anonymous Portuguese sailor] account first pub. 1939 in Christine von Rohr, ed., Neue Quellen zur zweiten Indienfahrt Vasco da Gamas, Leipzig: Koehler. [Reprinted with corrections by L. Freire Costa, 1985, "Relação anónima da segunda viagem de Vasco da Gama à índia" in Cidadania e História. Em homenagem a Jaime Cortesão. Lisbon: Sá da Costa.]
- Matteo da Bergamo Two Italian letters from Mozambique written Apr. 1503, pub. in 1902, Prospero Peragallo, ed., "Viaggio di Matteo da Bergamo in India sulla flotta di Vasco da Gama (1502–1503)", Bollettino della Società geografica italiana, pp. 92–129 online
- Thomé Lopes original Portuguese version lost; Italian translation first pub. 1550 as "Navigatione verso l'Indie orientali scritta per Thomé Lopez, scrivano de una nave Portoghesa", in Giovanni Battista Ramusio, ed., Primo volume delle navigationi et viaggi nel qua si contine la descrittione dell'Africa, et del paese del Prete Ianni, on varii viaggi, dal mar Rosso a Calicut,& infin all'isole Molucche, dove nascono le Spetierie et la navigatione attorno il mondo., Venice. online [Translated 1812 into Portuguese as "Navegação as Indias Orientaes, escrita em Portuguez por Thomé Lopes, traduzida da lingua Portugueza para a Italiana, e novamente do Italiano para o Portuguez", by Academia Real das Sciencias in Collecção de noticias para a historia e geografia das nações ultramarinas: que vivem nos dominios portuguezes, ou lhes são visinhas, Vol. 2, Pt. 5
- Pêro de Ataíde "Carta de Pero de Atayde a El-rei D. Manuel, Fevereiro 20, 1504", as published in Bulhão Pato, R.A. editor, 1898, Cartas de Affonso de Albuquerque, seguidas de documentos que as elucidam. Lisbon: Academia Real de Sciencias, vol. 2 pp. 262–268.
- Diogo Fernandes Correia "Carta de Diogo Fernandes Corrêa a Afonso de Albuquerque, Dezembro 25, 1503", as published in Bulhão Pato, R.A. editor, 1898, Cartas de Affonso de Albuquerque, seguidas de documentos que as elucidam. Lisbon: Academia Real de Sciencias, vol. 2 pp. 211–213.
- Francesco Corbinelli "Lettera di Francesco Corbinelli da Lisbona, Aug 22, 1503" [French trans. in P. Teyssier & P. Valentin translators, J. Aubin, ed.,Voyages de Vasco de Gama: relations des expéditions de 1497–1499 & 1502–1503. Paris: Chandeigne. pp. 353–355 online
- Giovanni Francesco Affaitati "Lettere di Zuan Francesco di l'Afaitada, data a Lisbona a di 19 avosto, 1503", repr. 1881 in Frederico Stefani, ed., I diarii di Marino Sanuto, Venice, vol. 5, pp. 130ff.

Chronicles:

- João de Barros (1552–59) Décadas da Ásia: Dos feitos, que os Portuguezes fizeram no descubrimento, e conquista, dos mares, e terras do Oriente.. Dec. I, Lib 6.
- Luís Vaz de Camões, (1572) Os Lusíadas. [trans. by W.J. Mickle, 1776, as The Lusiad, or the discovery of India, an epic poem]
- Fernão Lopes de Castanheda (1551–1560) História do descobrimento & conquista da Índia pelos portugueses [1833 edition] Lib 1, Ch. 44
- Gaspar Correia (c. 1550s) Lendas da Índia, first pub. 1858–64, Lisbon: Academia Real de Sciencias Vol. 1; [partially trans. H.E. Stanley, 1869, as The Three Voyages of Vasco de Gama, and his viceroyalty London: Hakluyt Society.]
- Manuel de Faria e Sousa (1666) Asia Portuguesa, Vol. 1.
- *Damião de Goes (1566–67) Chrónica do Felicíssimo Rei D. Manuel, da Gloriosa Memoria (As reprinted in 1749, Lisbon: M. Manescal da Costa) online
- Jerónimo Osório (1586) De rebus Emmanuelis [trans. Port., 1804, Da Vida e Feitos d'El Rei D. Manuel, Lisbon: Impressão Regia.] [trans. Eng. 1752 by J. Gibbs as The History of the Portuguese during the Reign of Emmanuel London: Millar]
- Relação das Náos e Armadas da India com os Sucessos dellas que se puderam Saber, para Noticia e Instrucção dos Curiozos, e Amantes da Historia da India (Codex Add. 20902 of the British Library), [D. António de Ataíde, orig. editor.] Transcribed & reprinted in 1985, by M.H. Maldonado, Biblioteca Geral da Universidade de Coimbra. online

Secondary:

- Aubin, J. (1995) "Preface", in Voyages de Vasco de Gama: relations des expéditions de 1497–1499 & 1502–1503. Paris: Chandeigne.
- Brito Rebelo, J.I. (1898) "Navegadores e exploradores portuguezes até o XVI século (Documentos para a sua historia: Vasco da Gama, sua família, suas viagens, seus companheiros", Revista de Educação e Ensino, v. 13
- Bouchon, G. (1975) Mamale de Cananor: Un adversaire de l'Inde portugaise, 1507–1528, Paris: Droz.
- Dames, M.L. (1918) "Introduction" in An Account Of The Countries Bordering On The Indian Ocean And Their Inhabitants, Vol. 1 (Engl. transl. of Livro de Duarte de Barbosa), 2005 reprint, New Delhi: Asian Education Services.
- Danvers, F.C. (1894) The Portuguese in India, being a history of the rise and decline of their eastern empire. 2 vols, London: Allen.
- Diffie, Bailey W., and George D. Winius (1977) Foundations of the Portuguese empire, 1415–1580 Minneapolis, MN: University of Minnesota Press
- Logan, W. (1887) Malabar Manual, 2004 reprint, New Delhi: Asian Education Services.
- Madan, K.D. (1998) Life and travels of Vasco Da Gama. New Delhi: Asian Educational Services.
- Quintella, Ignaco da Costa (1839–40) Annaes da Marinha Portugueza, 2 vols, Lisbon: Academia Real das Sciencias.
- Visconde de Sanches da Baena (1897) O Descobridor do Brazil, Pedro Alvares Cabral: memoria apresentada á Academia real das sciencias de Lisboa. Lisbon online
- Saraiva, Cardinal Francisco de S.L. (1849) Os Portuguezes em Africa, Asia, America, e Occeania, Lisbon: Borges.
- Strong, S. Arthur (1895) "The History of Kilwa, edited from an Arabic MS", Journal of the Royal Asiatic Society, Vol., pp. 385–431. online
- Subrahmanyam, S. (1997) The Career and Legend of Vasco da Gama. Cambridge, UK: Cambridge University Press.
- Theal, G.M. (1896) The Portuguese in South Africa: with a description of the native races between the River Zambesi and the Cape of Good Hope during the sixteenth century. London Unwin.
- Whiteway, R. S. (1899) The Rise of Portuguese Power in India, 1497–1550. Westminster: Constable.

Preceded by 3rd Armada (João da Nova, 1501)	Portuguese India Armada; 1502	Succeeded by 5th Armada (Afonso de Albuquerque, 1503)
