= David Mearns =

American maritime archaeologist

David Mearns OBE OAM
- Born: August 10, 1958 (age 68); Weehawken, New Jersey
- Education: Fairleigh Dickinson University; University of South Florida
- Occupation: Marine scientist

David Louis Mearns (born 10 August 1958) is an American-born, United Kingdom-based marine scientist and oceanographer, who specializes in deep water search and recovery operations, and the discovery of the location of historic shipwrecks.

== Early life ==
Mearns was raised in Weehawken, New Jersey, where he attended Weehawken High School, graduating in 1976. He subsequently graduated B.Sc. in Marine Biology from Fairleigh Dickinson University in 1980, and obtained a masters degree in Marine Geology from the University of South Florida in 1986.

== Oceanographic career ==
From 1986 to 1995 Mearns was employed in the commercial undersea surveying industry in a managerial capacity. In 1990 he worked on the criminal investigation into the deliberate sinking of the freighter Lucona by a time bomb, and in 1994 located the wreck of the ore-bulk-oil carrier MV Derbyshire. Relocating to England in the mid 1990s, he established Blue Water Recoveries, Limited, a commercial company that locates and researches historic deep-sea shipwrecks across the globe.

In 2001, to coincide with the 60th anniversary of the Battle of the Denmark Strait high seas confrontation between the naval forces of the British Empire and Nazi Germany during World War II, Mearns successfully led an expedition funded by Channel 4 Television to locate and film on the seabed of the North Atlantic Ocean the wrecks of the Royal Navy flagship HMS Hood, and its nemesis, the Bismarck. An extended television documentary entitled The Hunt for the Hood was produced from the expedition. In 2012 Mearns led an expedition, filmed for a British television documentary entitled How the Bismarck Sank HMS Hood, to re-visit the wreck of HMS Hood to facilitate study of the technical aspects of the warship's destruction.

Mearns and Blue Water Recoveries Ltd. holds five Guinness World Records, including one for the deepest shipwreck ever found, the German blockade runner Rio Grande, which was located at a depth of 5,762 metres (18,904 ft).

In 2008 Mearns led a search team to find the Australian cruiser HMAS Sydney and the German auxiliary cruiser Kormoran, which both sank following an engagement off Western Australia in 1941 during World War 2. Prior to finding HMAS Sydney, Mearns said that it was, in some ways, "bigger than the Titanic" because of what it meant to Australia. "Nothing comes close to the Sydney." At the end of 2010, he successfully led the search for another missing Australian shipwreck, the Hospital Ship Centaur, which was torpedoed off Queensland by a Japanese submarine in 1943. On 1 November 2010, Mearns was awarded an honorary Medal of the Order of Australia in recognition of his work in locating and analyzing the wrecks of HMAS Sydney and AHS Centaur.

On 3 March 2015, Mearns was part of a team led by Microsoft co-founder Paul Allen which located the wreck of the Japanese battleship Musashi in the Sibuyan Sea.

On 15 March 2016, Mearns jointly announced with the Ministry of Heritage & Culture of the Government of Oman the discovery of a shipwreck from Vasco da Gama's 4th Portuguese India Armada in 1502-1503. The wreck is believed to be the Portuguese nau Esmeralda that was commanded by Vicente Sodré, the maternal uncle of Vasco da Gama. Having sunk in May 1503, the Esmeralda is believed to be the earliest ship from Europe's Age of Discovery ever to be found and excavated by archaeologists. Mearns published a paper, with co-authors D. Parham and B. Frohlich, on the discovery in the International Journal of Nautical Archaeology.

Since 2003, Mearns has been studying the possible wreck location of Sir Ernest Shackleton's Endurance, which was lost during the Imperial Trans-Antarctic Expedition to the South Pole in 1915. Together with Lars Bergman and Robin Stuart, Mearns conducted new analysis of the final sinking position of Endurance's shipwreck based upon a re-analysis of the original lunar occultation timings made by Reginald James and Frank Worsley. Mearns delivered the Royal Institute of Navigation 2022 EGR Taylor Lecture on their analysis. Bergman, Mearns and Stuart were awarded a special Certificate of Achievement by the Royal Institute of Navigation "in recognition of their pioneering data analysis and modelling leading to the successful location of Endurance's wreck" which was ultimately found in March 2022 during an expedition aboard the South African polar research vessel S.A. Agulhas II.

In January 2019, Mearns was commissioned to locate a light-aircraft (carrying the professional footballer Emiliano Sala and pilot, David Ibbotson) which had disappeared whilst flying across the English Channel. On 3 February 2019 the search team led by Mearns located the wreck of the aircraft lying in waters around the Channel Islands.

Mearns was a lead member of a Royal Canadian Geographical Society team that discovered the wreckage of the Quest, the polar exploration vessel of the Shackleton–Rowett Expedition of 1921–1922 on which Sir Ernest Shackleton died in 1922. The wreck was found in 390 metres of water on the seabed of the Labrador Sea approximately 85 kilometres off Labrador's south coast, sitting almost upright, and appearing to be broadly intact.

== Personal life ==
Mearns lives in the West Sussex village of Lodsworth. He is a fellow of the Royal Geographical Society and the Explorers' Club.

== Awards and honours ==
- 2025: King Charles III Coronation Medal for a Significant Contribution to Canada
- 2025: Order of the British Empire OBE for services to the Location and Recovery of Historic Shipwrecks
- 2024: Joseph Elzéar Bernier Medal, Royal Canadian Geographical Society
- 2024: QUEST Medal, Royal Canadian Geographical Society
- 2024: Honorary Fellow of the Royal Canadian Geographical Society
- 2023: Certificate of Achievement, Royal Institute of Navigation
- 2019: Lowell Thomas Award, The Explorers Club
- 2019: Global Leadership Award, University of South Florida
- 2018: Mountbatten Best Book Award for The Shipwreck Hunter
- 2018: Society for Nautical Research Certificate of Merit for The Shipwreck Hunter
- 2015: Sir Robert Craven Award, Britannia Naval Research Association
- 2011: Distinguished Alumni Award, University of South Florida
- 2010: Maritime Fellowship Award, UK Maritime Foundation
- 2010: Honorary Medal of the Order of Australia OAM for service to Australia
- 1995: Seatrade Awards Safety at Sea Commendation for the MV Derbyshire Search Project

== Books ==
- Hood and Bismarck (Pub. Channel 4, London) 2001.
- The Search for the Sydney (Pub. HarperCollins) 2009.
- The Shipwreck Hunter (Pub. Allen & Unwin) 2017.
- The Sinking of H.M.A.S. Sydney (Pub. HarperCollins) 2018.
