= Vicente Sodré =

Anglo Portuguese knight

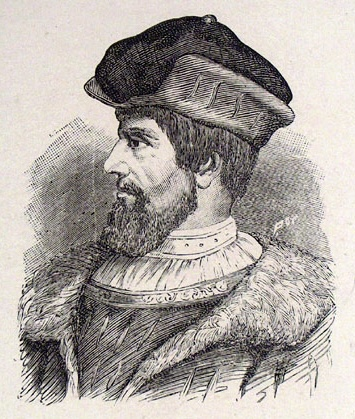
Vicente Sodré

Vicente Sodré (c. 1465 – 30 April 1503) was a 16th-century Anglo Portuguese knight of Order of Christ and the captain of the first Portuguese naval patrol in the Indian Ocean. He was an uncle of Portuguese explorer Vasco da Gama.

== Background ==
Vicente Sodré was the son of João Sodré (also known as João de Resende) and Isabel Serrão. The Sodrés were a well-connected family of English origin, said to have been descended from Frederick Sudley from Gloucestershire, who accompanied the Earl of Cambridge to Portugal in 1381, and subsequently settled down there. Sometime in the 1470s, Vicente Sodré entered the service of D. Diogo, Duke of Viseu, the grand master of the Order of Christ. Sodré joined the Order of Christ himself, and rose to the rank of commendador, holding the commenda of Maninhos in Idanha around 1493. In 1494, he was dispatched by the order's new grand master, Manuel, Duke of Beja, to the order-owned island of Madeira to audit the repairs of the defenses of the town of Funchal.

After Manuel, Duke of Beja succeeded to the throne as King Manuel I of Portugal in 1495, Vicente Sodré, became a knight of the royal household. Around 1501, Vicente Sodré succeeded his powerful relative Duarte Sodré as alcaide-mor of Tomar, that is governor of the town and great Templar citadel, the spiritual home of the Order of Christ.

Vicente Sodré's siblings include his brother Brás Sodré and his sister Isabel Sodré, who married Estêvão da Gama and became the mother of Vasco da Gama. Unlike the Sodrés, the Gamas were attached to the Order of Santiago, perennial rivals of the Order of Christ.

== Expedition to India (1502) ==
In 1501, the 2nd Armada of Pedro Álvares Cabral finally returned from India, and preparations immediately began for the assembly of a new India armada (the 4th), to be sent out in 1502, again under Cabral. Vicente Sodré was appointed by King Manuel I of Portugal as the first Capitão-mor do Mar da Índia ('Captain-major of the Indian Sea'), i.e. commander of the first Portuguese naval patrol in the Indian Ocean. Sodré was given a royal regimento, instructing him to patrol and prey on Arab shipping at the mouth of the Red Sea.

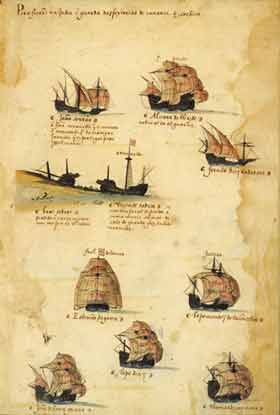
Sodré squadron of 1502 Armada

Vicente Sodré's patrol was designated to go to India as a distinct squadron of the 4th Armada of 1502, and to remain behind on patrol. However, Sodré insisted that his regimento be independent - that is, that the 4th armada's admiral, Pedro Álvares Cabral, have absolutely no authority over his (Sodré's) squadron for the duration of the voyage. King Manuel I of Portugal, who had strong doubts about Cabral's competence, agreed. Cabral found this condition humiliating and withdrew his name in a huff. Vicente Sodré helped secure the appointment of his nephew, Vasco da Gama, to replace Cabral as admiral of the 4th Armada. In the new regimento, Vasco da Gama would remain in command of Sodré's squadron only until India, after which the new separate regimento would apply.

The 4th India Armada under Vasco da Gama sailed out of Lisbon in February 1502, with Vicente Sodré in command of a squadron of five ships. After making stops in Mozambique Island and Kilwa, the armada arrived in India in September, engaging in various actions along the Indian coast in late 1502. Vicente Sodré is credited for rescuing Vasco da Gama from an ambush in Calicut harbor, and he took a leading role in the defeat of the large fleet of the Zamorin of Calicut at a naval battle before Calicut harbor in December.

Vicente Sodré was responsible for a notorious incident (reported by chronicler Gaspar Correia (p. 307)) with a wealthy and well-connected Egyptian merchant in Cannanore, who was about to leave port without paying customs duties to the Cannanore port authorities. Sodré fetched him from his boat and marched him to the customs house. When the annoyed merchant, after paying his bill, muttered a curse about the Kolathiri Raja of Cannanore (a Portuguese ally), Vicente Sodré grabbed the merchant and, in full view of the customers officers and port crowds, stripped him naked, tied him to a post and had him beaten with clubs (the merchant being a fat man, Sodré ordered them to aim their clubs at his stomach). Taken down from the post half-dead, Sodré ordered the battered merchant tied up and then proceeded to fill his mouth with dirt and pieces of bacon (the merchant offered Sodré 10,000 gold pieces to forego this final humiliation, but he rejected it). The merchant would go on to Cairo, and report his mistreatment in the court of Mameluke Sultan al-Ashraf Qansuh al-Ghawri. Correia suggests the Egyptian merchant's testimony was critical in rousing the sultan into taking more active steps against the Portuguese in the Indian Ocean.

== Indian Ocean Patrol (1503) ==
In February 1503, Vasco da Gama returned with the 4th Armada to Lisbon, leaving Vicente Sodré behind in the command of the Indian Ocean patrol (five or six ships, one of which was under the command of his own brother, Brás Sodré). However, before his departure, Vasco da Gama ordered his uncles to keep the patrol near the Malabar Coast of India, to protect the Portuguese-allied cities of Cochin and Cannanore from any vengeful attacks by the Zamorin of Calicut.

However, as soon as Gama left, Vicente Sodré invoked his regimento and ordered the patrol to leave India and follow him to the Red Sea. The Portuguese factors in Cochin and Cannanore protested, citing evidence of imminent preparations for an attack by the Zamorin. It said that two of the patrol captains refused to go along, and resigned the commands of their ships. Vicente Sodré dismissed the rumors and took the patrol with him.

As expected, in March 1503, the Zamorin of Calicut arrived before Cochin with an army of 50,000, and seized and burned down the city. The Portuguese factors, along the Cochin's ruler, managed to escape to the nearby island of Vypin. They continued to hold out until August, when the next armada arrived.

During the siege of Cochin, Vicente Sodré's patrol was nowhere to be seen. It had gone first north to Gujarat, where it captured a great merchant ship off Chaul. The patrol then sailed west into the Gulf of Aden, at the mouth of the Red Sea, to catch more prizes.

Vicente Sodré's patrol captured around five Arab merchant ships at the mouth of the Red Sea. But the partition of the spoils left a lot to be desired - the Sodré brothers set about claiming the lion's share of the plunder for themselves, and leaving little for the others or even the crown(Brás Sodré, in particular, was accused of embezzling the royal fifth due to the crown). Already unhappy at abandoning their brethren in India, the patrol captains quarreled with the Sodrés and nearly mutinied.

Around 20 April 1503, the patrol anchored in at Kuria Muria islands (off the coast of Oman). The local inhabitants warned them that a seasonal tempest was forming and that they had better move their ships to a safer shelter on the southern side of the island. Four patrol captains moved their ships accordingly, but Vicente Sodré and Brás Sodré refused (the ongoing quarrel over the spoils may have been a factor in this separation.) As the locals predicted, the tempest came on 30 April, and sunk the exposed ships of Vicente Sodré and Brás Sodré. In the aftermath, the four remaining ships of the Indian Ocean patrol, now under the command of Pêro de Ataíde, elected to return at once to India.

Ataíde would later (in February 1504) compose a letter to the king, with an account of the travails of the Indian Ocean patrol. He carefully excused Vicente Sodré's actions, laying most of the blame on the bad counsel and decisions of Brás Sodré (who really comes out as the villain of the story). Although it is significant that Ataíde, in that same letter, asked the king to grant him Vicente Sodré's old position of alcalde-mor of Tomar (Ataide, alas, died shortly after in Mozambique).

Ataíde wrote that Vicente Sodré sunk and died immediately in the tempest at Kuria Muria, but that Brás Sodré actually survived the wreck. However, once ashore, Brás Sodré decided to blame his Muslim pilots and executed them on the spot. Ataíde refrains from saying exactly what happened to Brás Sodré after that, only that 'many things transpired' before his death.

== Shipwrecks ==
The wreck site of Vicente and Bras Sodré's ships was first discovered just off the north-eastern coast of Al Hallaniyah island, Oman, in May 1998 by a two-person team from Blue Water Recoveries Ltd (BWR); location was based on the company's own analysis of historical documents. Later that year, a larger team from BWR, including a contracted nautical archaeologist from Portugal, conducted a reconnaissance survey of the bay and wreck site. They recovered a number of artifacts consistent with an early 16th-century shipwreck, including lead-covered iron shot, stone cannonballs of varying sizes, and a sounding lead. Expeditions were conducted under a permit from the Oman Government. No further investigation of the site was conducted, primarily because of the considerable complexity and cost of supporting a full archaeological excavation in this remote location. These challenges were addressed in 2013 by David L. Mearns, owner and Director of BWR, and an agreement was made with Oman's Ministry of Heritage and Culture (MHC) to jointly conduct and co-manage the project. The MHC is the official government body responsible for the protection of Oman's underwater cultural heritage, and this was the first collaborative archaeological excavation of a historic wreck-site in Omani waters. Additional funding and support was provided by National Geographic's Expeditions Council and the non-profit Waitt Institute. Comprehensive geophysical surveys of Ghubatt ar Rahib bay and archaeological excavations of the near-shore wreck site took place in 2013, 2014 and 2015. Underwater archaeology was directed by Dave Parham, Associate Professor in Maritime Archaeology at Bournemouth University, while Dr. Bruno Frohlich, Emeritus Scientist from the Smithsonian Institution, led investigation of possible land burial sites. Over the three field seasons, expedition teams of 12 to 18 spent a total of 50 days working on site, and accumulated 1,079 hours underwater. More than 2,800 artifacts have been recovered from the site, including a ship's bell with a date of 1498, an important copper-alloy disc marked with the royal coat of arms of Portugal and the "esfera armilar"(armillary sphere) - a personal emblem of King Manuel I, and an extremely rare silver coin known as the "INDIO", first minted in 1499 by the Portuguese specifically for trade with India. The disc was later confirmed to be a unique and rare mariner's astrolabe that has been named the Sodré Astrolabe. Salvaged objects also included a large quantity of ordinance (stone, iron and lead shot, and 19 copper-alloy breech chambers). They underscore the military mission of the Sodré squadron. On 15 March 2016, the MHC formally announced the discovery of the wreck site at a press conference in Muscat, and simultaneously published an interim print report by Mearns, Parham and Frohlich in the International Journal of Nautical Archaeology. A project-specific website was also launched. The IJNA article, which relies on extensive scientific testing of the recovered objects and contributions from numerous other experts, also concludes that the probable source of the remaining, unsalvaged wreckage is from Vicente Sodré's ship "Esmeralda".

== Reputation ==
Despite Ataíde's efforts at gentle treatment, Portuguese 16th-century chroniclers have usually presented Vicente Sodré in a negative light - principally because of his abandonment of Cochin to the assault of the Zamorin of Calicut. Sodré's greed for spoils is blamed for nearly costing the Portuguese their position in India and dishonoring their name before their Indian allies. At the Battle of Cochin (1504), the new Portuguese patrol captain Duarte Pacheco Pereira had a hard time persuading the Cochinese that he would not abandon them, as Sodré had done. In King Manuel of Portugal's regimento to Diogo Lopes de Sequeira in 1508, the king himself explicitly cites Vicente Sodré's carelessness and cost to the crown.

Chronicler Gaspar Correia perhaps goes furthest in vilification, portraying Vicente Sodré as a brutish, greedy and petty tyrant. "A man of strong condition and lustful for money, with no other intention but to enrich himself" Correia cites Vicente Sodré's mistreatment of a well-connected Cairo merchant in Cannanore as the spark which set off the assembly of an Egyptian-led fleet to dislodge the Portuguese from the Indian Ocean in 1507.

Vicente Sodré was the subject of an 1894 historical romance by Manuel Pinheiro Chagas.

Vicente Sodré had two sons - João Sodré and a natural son, Fernão Sodré, born of the unmarried Isabel Fernandes, who was legitimized by special letter from the king and went on to have a career of note as governor of Hormuz. Simão Sodré, later a captain in the Indies, was the only son of Brás Sodré.

It is sometimes thought that the Lisbon railway station of Cais do Sodré (Sodré's Wharf) was named after Vicente Sodré. In fact it was named after Duarte Sodré, his relative and predecessor in Tomar, who owned a couple of estates in the area.

== See also ==
- 4th Portuguese India Armada (Gama, 1502)

== Sources ==
- Diogo Fernandes Corrêa "Carta de Diogo Fernandes Corrêa a Afonso de Albuquerque, Dezembro 25, 1503", in Bulhão Pato, R.A. editor, 1898, Cartas de Affonso de Albuquerque, seguidas de documentos que as elucidam. Lisbon: Academia Real de Sciencias, vol. 2 p.211-213.
- Pêro de Ataíde "Carta de Pero de Atayde a El-rei D. Manuel, Fevereiro 20, 1504", as published in Bulhão Pato, R.A. editor, 1898, Cartas de Affonso de Albuquerque, seguidas de documentos que as elucidam. Lisbon: Academia Real de Sciencias, vol. 2 p.262-268.
- João de Barros (1552–59) Décadas da Ásia: Dos feitos, que os Portuguezes fizeram no descubrimento, e conquista, dos mares, e terras do Oriente..
- Manuel Pinheiro Chagas (1894) O naufragio de Vicente Sodré
- Gaspar Correia (c. 1550s) Lendas da Índia, pub. 1858-64, Lisbon: Academia Real de Sciencias
- Manuel de Faria e Sousa (1666) Asia Portuguesa, Vol. 1.
- Damião de Goes (1566–67) Crónica do Felicíssimo Rei D. Manuel
- Jerónimo Osório (1586) De rebus Emmanuelis [trans. 1752 by J. Gibbs as The History of the Portuguese during the Reign of Emmanuel London: Millar]
- Subrahmanyam, S. (1997) The Career and Legend of Vasco da Gama. Cambridge, UK: Cambridge University Press.
- Whiteway, R. S. (1899) The Rise of Portuguese Power in India, 1497-1550. Westminster: Constable.
