= Estêvão da Gama (c. 1470) =

Portuguese navigator and explorer

Estêvão da Gama (c. 1470) was a Portuguese navigator and explorer who discovered the Trindade and Martim Vaz islands in modern Brazil.

Estêvão da Gama was Vasco da Gama's cousin, son of his cousin Aires da Gama, as explained by Manuel de Faria e Sousa, in its work Ásia Portuguesa (1675). He was Captain-major of the Portuguese army in India in 1503.

== See also ==
- 4th Portuguese India Armada (Gama, 1502)
