= Manuel de Faria e Sousa =

Portuguese historian and poet

Manuel de Faria e Sousa (European Portuguese pronunciation: [mɐnuˈɛl dɨ fɐˈɾi.ɐ i ˈsozɐ]; Spanish: Manuel de Faría y Sosa; 18 March 1590 – 3 June 1649) was a Portuguese historian and poet who frequently wrote in Spanish.

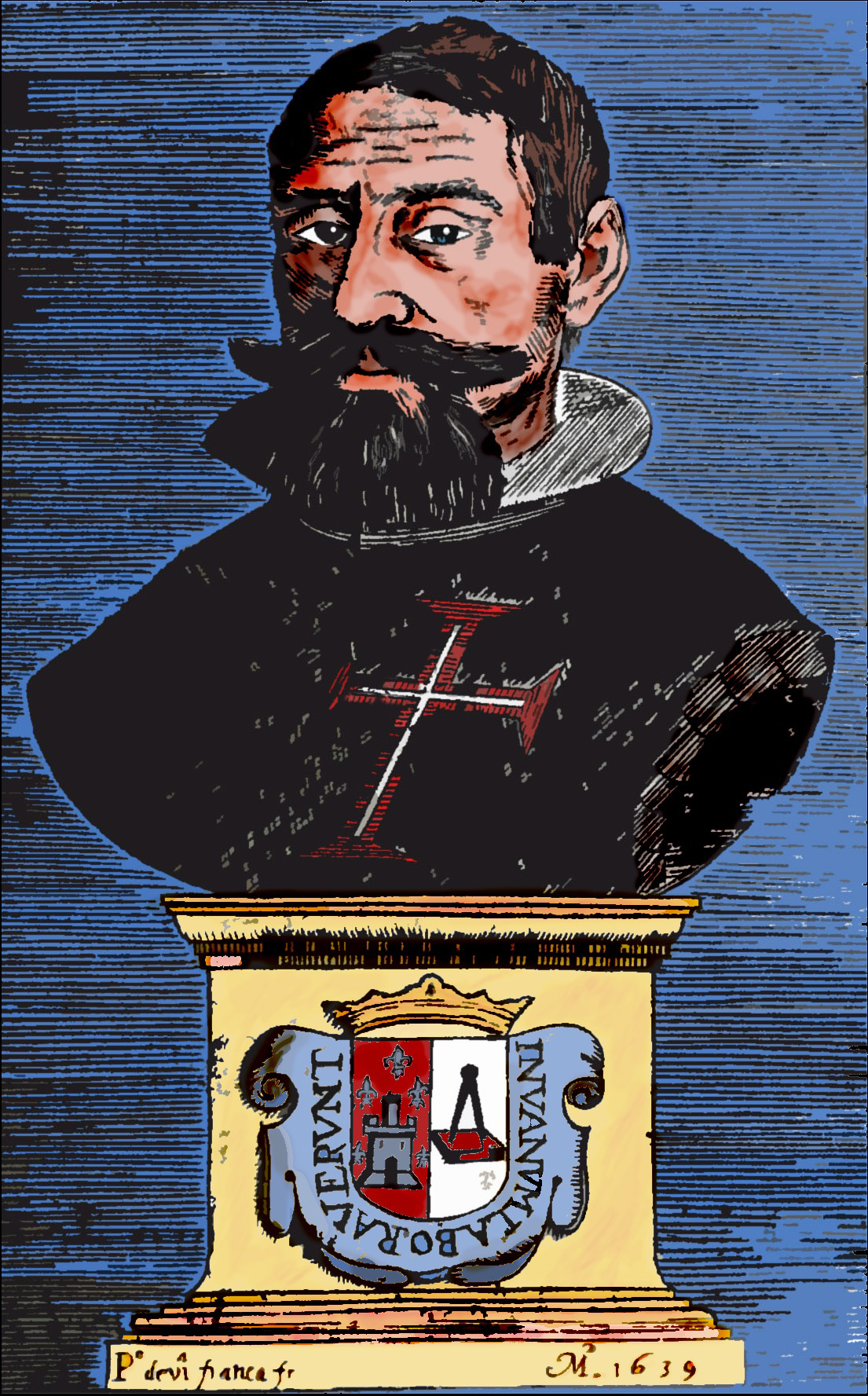
Portrait of Manuel de Faria e Sousa in Ásia portuguesa

Born into a Portuguese noble family, Faria e Sousa studied in Braga before serving the Bishop of Porto. Aside from his time with the Portuguese embassy in Rome from 1631 to 1634, he spent most of his later life in Madrid, where he died in June 1649. He was married to Catarina Machado, the "Albania" of his poems.

His early work, Epitome de las historias Portuguesas (Madrid, 1628), was published in Madrid. His commentary on Os Lusíadas and the poetry of Luís de Camões led to his temporary imprisonment and the loss of his salary by the Inquisition. He continued writing, reportedly producing up to 12 folio pages daily. He died on 3 June 1649, leaving his history of the Portuguese across the world unfinished.

Posthumously published portions of his history include Europa Portuguesa (Lisbon, 1667), Ásia Portugueza (Lisbon, 1666–1675), and Africa Portugueza (Lisbon, 1681), all edited by Captain Faria e Sousa. A poet, Faria e Sousa was influenced by the Gongorismo style. His poems were mostly collected in Noches claras (Madrid, 1624–1626) and Fuente de Aganipe (Madrid, 1644–1646). He also wrote Imperio de China i cultura evangélica (Madrid, 1642) and completed the Nobiliário of the Count of Barcelos. English translations of his works include the History of Portugal (1698) and Portuguese Asia (1695).

== Works ==
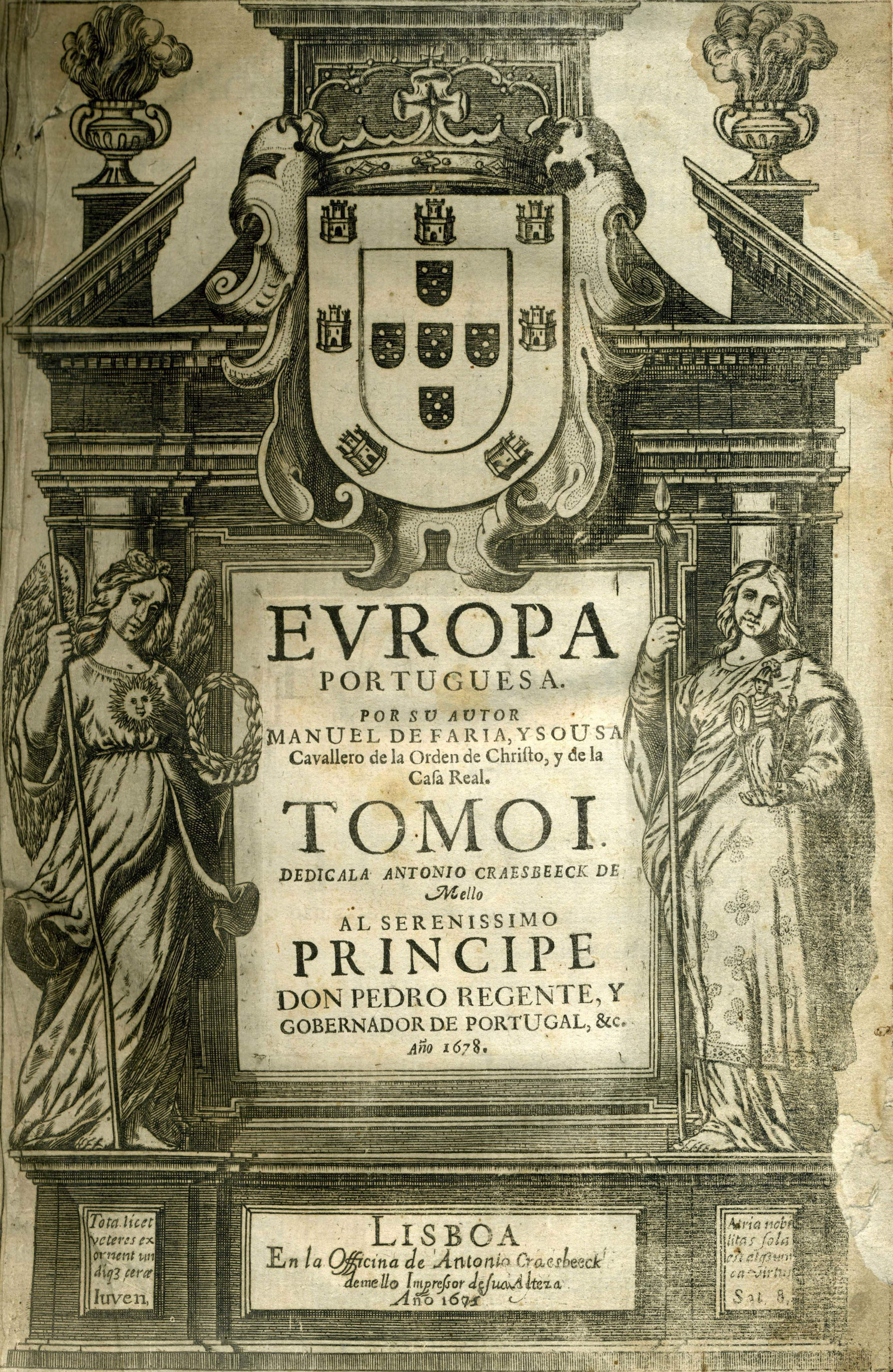
Frontispiece of Europa Portuguesa, 1678

- Muerte de Jesus y llanto de Maria. Madrid, 1623.
- Fabula de Narciso e Echo. Lisboa, 1623. In Portuguese.
- Divinas e humanas flores. Madrid, por Diego Flamenco 1624.
- Noches claras. Madrid, por Diego Flamenco 1624.
- Fuente de Aganipe y Rimas varias. Madrid, por Sanchez 1644, 1646. In Portuguese and Spanish. In seven parts:
1. 600 sonetos
2. 12 "poemas em outava rythma, silvas e sexinas[1]"
3. Canções, odes, 200 madrigals ("madrigales"), sextinas e tercetos
4. 20 eclogas
5. Redondilhas, glosas, cantilenas, decimas, romances e epigramas
6. "Musa nueva" com sonetos, oitavas, tercetos, canções, etc. reduzidos a versos octosilabos
7. "Engenho" de acrostichos, esdrújulos, ecos, etc.
- Epithalamio de los casamientos de los señores Marqueses de Molina. Saragoça, 1624.
- Epitome de las historias portuguesas. Madrid, por Francisco martinez 1628.
  - The same work is later amplified with the title of Europa portuguesa.
- Escuriale por Jacobum Gibbes Anglum. Madrid, 1658. Tradução em castelhano duma descrição do Escurial em latim.
- Lusiadas de Luis de Camoens, principe de los poetas de España. Comentadas. Madrid, por Juan Sanches 1639.
- Informacion a favor de Manuel de faria y sousa etc., 1640.
- Peregrino instruido.
- Imperio de la China e cultura evangelica en el, etc.
- Nenia: poema acrostico a la reyna de España D. Isabel de Bourbon. Madrid, 1644.
- Nobiliario del Conde de Barcellos D. Pedro, hijo delrey D. Dionis de Portugal, traducido etc. Madrid, 1646.
- El gran justicia de Aragon Don Martin Baptista de Lanuza. Madrid, 1650.
- Asia Portuguesa. 3 tomes:
1. Lisboa, Henrique Valente de Oliveira, 1666: History of Índia, since its discovery until 1538.
2. Lisboa, Antonio Craesbeeck de Mello, 1674: History of Índia, from 1538 to 1581.
3. Lisboa, ibidem, 1675: History of Índia, during the Spanish dominion (1581 - 1640).
- Europa Portuguesa. 3 tomes:
1. Lisboa, Antonio Craesbeeck de Mello, 1678: From universal diluvio to Portugal with king.
2. Lisboa, Ibid, 1679: From Government of Count D. Henrique to D. João III.
3. Lisboa, Ibid, 1680: From king D. Sebastião to Filipe III of Portugal.
- África Portuguesa. Lisboa, Antonio Craesbeeck de Mello, 1681: History of conquest from D. João I to 1562.
- Rimas varias de Luis de Camoens, etc. comentadas. Lisboa, Theotonio Damaso de Mello, 1685.
