= 6th Portuguese India Armada (Albergaria, 1504) =

The Sixth India Armada was assembled in 1504 on the order of King Manuel I of Portugal and placed under the command of Lopo Soares de Albergaria.

== The Fleet ==
The 6th Armada was composed of 13 ships: approximately nine large nau or carracks, plus four small navetas (caravels) and 1200 men. The exact composition of the fleet differs in the various accounts.

The following list of ships should not be regarded as authoritative, but a tentative list compiled from various conflicting accounts.

Captain	Notes
1. Lopo Soares de Albergaria/Alvarenga
2. Pêro de Mendonça/Mascarenhas	lost on return
3. D. Leonel Coutinho
4. Lopo de Abreu (da Ilha)	vice-admiral?
5. Pedro Afonso de Aguiar
6. Lopo Mendes de Vasconcelos/Martins
7. Manuel Telles de Vasconcelos/Barreto
8. Tristão da Silva
9. Filipe de Castro
10. Vasco da Silveira/Silva
11. Afonso Lopes da Costa (nta)
12. Vasco de Carvalho (nta)
13. Pedro Dias/Dinis de Setúbal (nta)	omitted in some lists. See note below.

No actual names of ships are known. Chronicles suggest most were carracks (naus), accompanied by three or four smaller ships (either navetas or caravels), denoted as nta in the list). The captains of three of the navetas are identified in all the chronicles, although there is some disagreement over the fourth (if there was a fourth). The above list of captains is principally based on João de Barros's Décadas (Dec. 1, Lib.7), Damião de Gois's Chronica, Castanheda's História and Quintella's Annaes da Marinha. The Relação das Naus da Índia introduces some of the name variations. As usual, Gaspar Correia differs from the others: he omits the fourth small ship of Pedro Dias (or Dinis) de Setúbal, and introduces instead two new small ships, one under Simão de Alcáçova, another under Cristóvão de Távora, bringing the total to fourteen. To get thirteen again, Correia asserts the captain-major Lopo Soares de Albergaria does not have his own ship, but is aboard the ship captained by Pêro de Mendonça (at least on outbound journey).

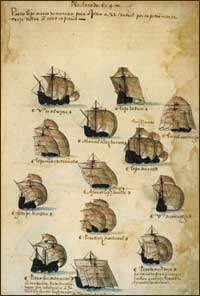
Depiction of the 6th India Armada (Albergaria, 1504), from the Memória das Armadas

The admiral of the fleet (capitão-mor, captain-major) was Lopo Soares de Albergaria (sometimes called Lopo Soares de Alvarenga, or simply Lopo Soares). Albergaria was a middling noble, well-connected to the Almeida family, and had served a successful term (1495–99) as captain-general of São Jorge da Mina in the Portuguese Gold Coast (West Africa). Lopo Soares de Albergaria sailed either on his own ship or on the ship captained by Pêro de Mendonça. Lopo de Abreu da Ilha may have been designated vice-admiral, although D. Leonel Coutinho may have been a higher noble. Manuel Telles de Vasconcelos was the nephew of influential Portuguese courtier and royal advisor Duarte Galvão. Two of the captains are veterans of earlier expeditions: Pedro Afonso de Aguiar and Lopo Mendes de Vasconcellos had sailed in the 4th Armada of 1502.

There was some private participation in the fleet. At least one of the ships was outfitted by Catarina Dias de Aguiar, a wealthy merchant woman from Lisbon.

The carracks were designated to return to Lisbon with spice cargoes, the three or four small ships (navetas or caravels) were slated to remain in India, to bolster the local Portuguese coastal patrol.

== The Mission ==
The 2nd India Armada (1500) under Pedro Álvares Cabral had opened hostilities between the Kingdom of Portugal and the Zamorin (king) of Calicut (Calecute, Kozhikode), the dominant maritime power on the Malabar Coast of India.

The large and well-armed 4th Armada of 1502 led by Vasco da Gama had hoped to, by means of strong show of force, persuade the Zamorin to sue for terms. But in spite of terror, bombardment and blockade, the Zamorin had refused to yield. The Zamorin's defiance convinced Vasco da Gama that this was going to be a longer fight than he had anticipated, one that required more men and firepower than he had at hand. Gama's 4th Armada left India, intent on requesting a stronger fleet from Lisbon, with enough men and arms, if not to reduce Calicut, to at least defend the Portuguese-allied city-states of Cochin (Cochim, Kochi) and Cannanore (Canonor, Kannur).

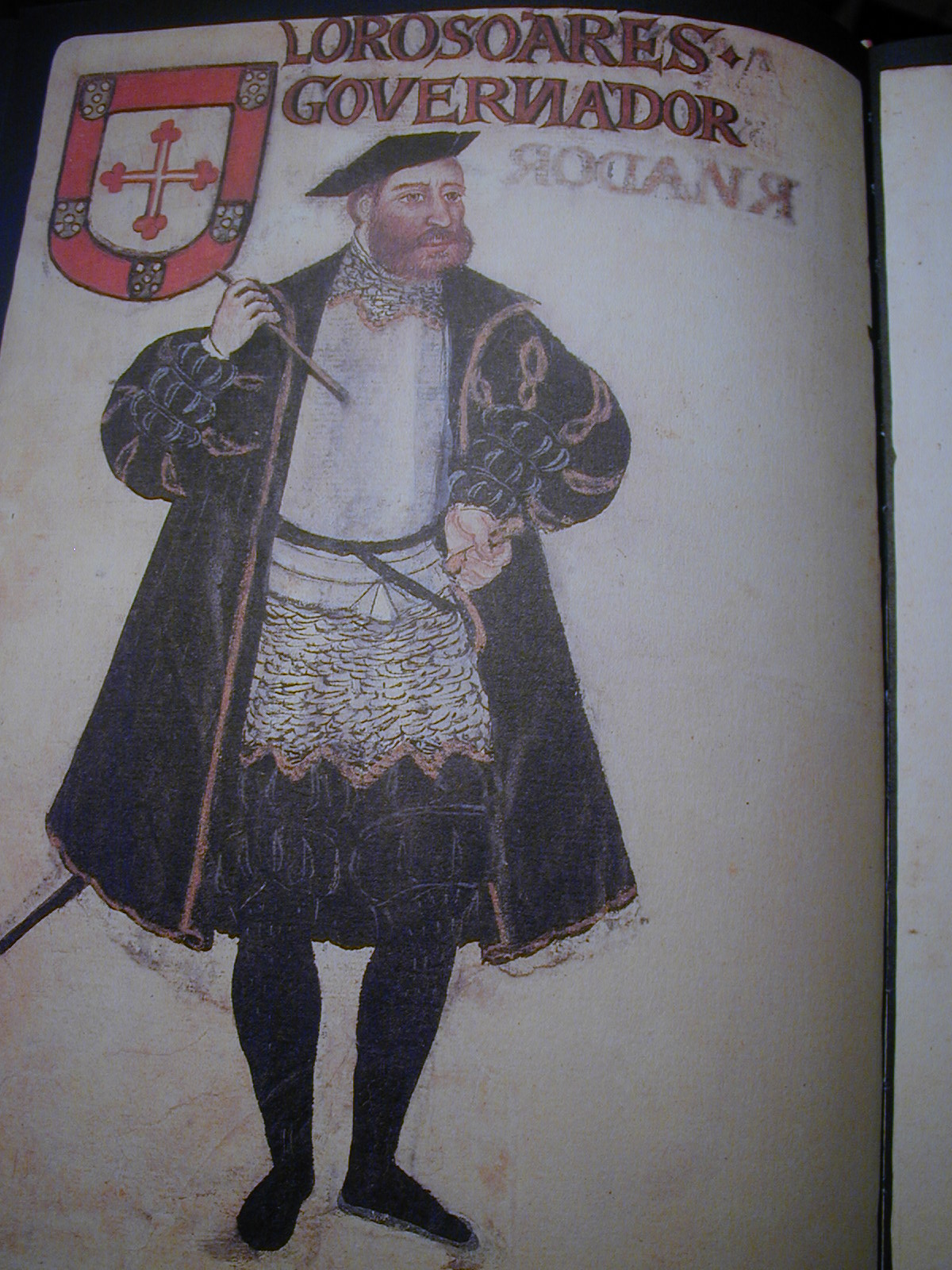
Lopo Soares de Albergaria

Gama delivered his report to Lisbon in 1503, too late to affect the outfitting of the 5th Armada, which had left under the command of Afonso de Albuquerque a few months earlier. Although unequipped to challenge Calicut itself, the 5th Armada did enough to save Cochin from falling into the hands of the Zamorin's army and helped bolster its defenses by erecting a timber fort in the city.

Basing themselves only on Vasco da Gama's report, the 6th Armada that set out in early 1504 was equipped more purposefully, bringing more soldiers and ships to protect the Portuguese factories in Cochin and Cannanore. As noted explicitly in his regimento, Lopo Soares de Albergaria was under strict orders to accept no peace with the Zamorin of Calicut, and do what he could to harass Calicut.

== Outward Voyage ==
April 22, 1504 - The 13 ships of the 6th Armada leave the Tagus estuary.

May 2 - Ships arrive at the first collection point, Cape Verde. Lopo Soares announces that since they left Lisbon so late, there is no room for error. He lays down a set of strict sailing instructions, and warns pilots and masters he will dock their pay for every mistake.

June - Proceeding in good order, the 6th Armada reaches the Cape of Good Hope.

June 25 - The 6th armada reaches Mozambique Island. There, Lopo Soares finds the testimonial letter left behind by Pêro de Ataíde, the former captain of the India patrol, who had died there in February. It is here that Lopo Soares learns of the debacle of the coastal patrol of Vicente Sodré and Calicut's attack on Cochin the previous Spring.

August 1 - Lopo Soares leaves Mozambique. Although instructed by his regimento to make a stop in Malindi, it is possible he sails for India directly from Mozambique. But Damião de Góis reports the 6th Armada did stop at Malindi, and was (as usual) well received by the Sultan of Malindi. Góis asserts the Sultan of Malindi not only resupplied the ships, but provided Lopo Soares with a Muslim pilot named 'Debucar'. He also handed over sixteen Portuguese shipwrecked sailors, survivors of Ataíde's capsized ship, who had been collected by Malindi boats earlier that year. The 6th Armada remains in Malindi only two days, before setting off on their Indian Ocean crossing.

== Lopo Soares in India ==
Ataide's letter gave Lopo Soares the news of India up until February, 1504. What Lopo Soares did not know (but probably could guess) was that at this very moment there was a desperate battle going on in Cochin. In March, the Zamorin of Calicut had launched a massive attack on Cochin, intending to capture the city and seize the Portuguese fortress. He brought some 57,000 troops, equipped with Turkish firearms and Venetian cannon. The tiny Portuguese garrison at Cochin, some 150 men under the command of Duarte Pacheco Pereira, by clever positioning, individual heroics and quite some luck, had managed to fend off attack after attack by the Zamorin's army and fleet in the ensuing months. The last assault was launched in early July, after which the humiliated Zamorin called off the invasion.

August, 1504 - Crossing the Indian Ocean, the 6th Armada of Lopo Soares de Albergaria arrives at Anjediva island. There they find two Portuguese ships repairing - those of António de Saldanha and Rui Lourenço Ravasco. They had been part of the third squadron of the previous year's 5th Armada. They relate their sorry tale - how they got lost and separated in Africa, how they spent the winter season harassing East African ports and Red Sea shipping, and how they were only able to undertake their Indian Ocean crossing this summer. They have no idea of the whereabouts of the third ship of their squadron, that of Diogo Fernandes Pereira, having lost track of it nearly a year ago. (As it happens, Diogo Fernandes Pereira had wintered in Socotra by himself and undertook a solo crossing to India earlier that Spring, arriving in Cochin just in time to help Duarte Pacheco fend off the assaults of the Zamorin.)

Late August/Early September, 1504 - Saldanha and Lourenço accompany Lopo Soares' 6th Armada down the coast to Cannanore. Arriving there, Albergaria finally hears fuller reports from the Cannanore factor Gonçalo Gil Barbosa about the battle of Cochin. Lopo Soares sets sail towards it at once.

September 7, 1504 - The 6th Armada appears before Calicut. Lopo Soares dispatches a message to the Zamorin, demanding he hand over any and all Portuguese prisoners to him; moreover, he demands that they also deliver the two Venetian engineers who had been helping the Zamorin build European cannon. The Zamorin is absent from the city at the moment, but his ministers are willing to release the Portuguese prisoners. The Italians, however, they cannot. Restless, Lopo Soares has the 6th Armada subject Calicut to forty-eight hours of continuous shore bombardment, causing great damage.

Satisfied, the 6th Armada proceeds south to Cochin. They are met at Fort Manuel by the Trimumpara Raja and the tired Portuguese garrison. But the fort's commander Duarte Pacheco Pereira himself is not there at that moment (he had recently left on a jaunt to Quilon, to check on the Portuguese factory there). Greetings and gifts are exchanged - including a sizeable sum of cash sent by Manuel I of Portugal as a reward for the Trimumpara Raja's alliance.

With the Cochin spice markets starved by the recent siege, Lopo Soares sets about collecting spices from elsewhere. Four or five ships (Lopes da Costa, Aguiar, Coutinho, Abreu and perhaps another) are sent down to Quilon to load up. Two ships (Pêro de Mendonça and Vasco Carvalho) are sent out to patrol the coast south of Calicut, and seize whatever merchant ships they can (and take their spice cargoes), while Tristão da Silva, joined by five local bateis (pinnaces) are dispatched on patrol duty inside the lagoon.

Hearing of the armada's arrival, Duarte Pacheco (then in Quilon) sets sail back to Cochin, and meets Lopo Soares on September 14 (October 22 according to Castanheda).

=== Raid on Cranganore ===
October, 1504 - While in Cochin, Lopo Soares receives reports that the Zamorin of Calicut has dispatched a force to fortify Cranganore, the port city at the northern end of the Vembanad lagoon, and the usual entry point for the Zamorin's army and fleet into the Malabari backwaters. Reading this as a preparation for a renewed attack on Cochin after his 6th Armada leaves, Lopo Soares decides on a preemptive strike. He orders a squadron of around ten fighting ships and numerous Cochinese bateis and paraus, to head up there. The heavier ships, unable to make their way into the shallow channels, anchored at Palliport (Pallipuram, on the outer edge of Vypin island, guarding the channel between Cranganore and the sea).

Converging on Cranganore, the Portuguese-Cochinese Vembanad fleet quickly disperses the Zamorin's forces on the beach with cannon fire, and then lands an amphibian assault force - some 1,000 Portuguese and 1,000 Cochinese Nairs, who take on the rest of the Zamorin's forces in close combat. The Zamorin's forces are defeated and driven away from the city.

The assault troops capture Cranganore, and subject the ancient city, the once-great capital of the Chera Dynasty of Kerala, to a thorough and violent sacking and razing. Even while the main fighting was still going on, deliberate fires were set around the city by squads led by Duarte Pacheco Pereira and factor Diogo Fernandes Correa. The fires quickly consume most of the city, save for the Syrian Christian quarters, which are carefully spared (Hindu and Jewish homes are not given the same consideration).

Hearing of the attack, the Zamorin had dispatched a hastily formed Calicut fleet, some 5 ships and 80 paraus, to save the city. But they are intercepted by the idling Portuguese ships near Palliport and defeated in a brief naval encounter.

Two days later, the Portuguese receive an urgent message from the ruler of Tanur (Tanore), whose kingdom lay to the north, on the road between Calicut and Cranganore. The raja of Tanur had come to loggerheads with his overlord, the Zamorin, and offered to place himself under Portuguese suzerainty instead, in return for military assistance. He reports that a Calicut column, led by the Zamorin himself, had been assembled in a hurry to try to save Cranganore, but that he managed to block their passage at Tanur. Lopo Soares immediately dispatches Pêro Rafael with a caravel and a sizeable Portuguese armed force to assist the Tanurese. The Zamorin's column is defeated and dispersed soon after its arrival.

The raid on Cranganore and the defection of Tanur are serious setbacks to the Zamorin, pushing the frontline north, effectively placing the Vembanad lagoon out of the Zamorin's reach. Any hopes the Zamorin had of quickly resuming his attempts to capture Cochin via the backwaters are effectively dashed.

No less importantly, the battles at Cranganore and Tanur, which involved significant numbers of Malabari captains and troops, clearly demonstrated that the Zamorin was no longer feared in the region. The Battle of Cochin had broken his authority. Cranganore and Tanur showed that Malabaris were no longer afraid of defying his authority and taking up arms against him. The Portuguese were no longer just a passing nuisance, a handful of terrifying pirates who came and went once a year. They were a permanent disturbance, turning the old order upside down. A new chapter was being opened on the Malabar coast.

=== Departure from Cochin ===
In late December 1504 - His naus loaded with spices from the markets of Cochin and Quilon (and topped off with cargoes from seized merchant ships), Lopo Soares prepares his departure from Cochin. Duarte Pacheco Pereira, the hero of the battle of Cochin, is slated to be relieved as captain of Fort Manuel. It is said that the Trimumpara Raja of Cochin, who had become personally attached to Duarte Pacheco during the battle earlier that year, was beside himself with grief and did everything he could to persuade Lopo Soares to let Duarte Pacheco stay on. But Lopo Soares refuses. Bowing to inevitability, the Trimumpara offers Duarte Pacheco a free cargo of pepper as a personal reward for his services, but Duarte Pacheco, knowing how the Trimumpara Raja had been personally impoverished by the war, refuses to take it.

Duarte Pacheco's replacement as capitão-mor of Fort Manuel of Cochin is nobleman Manuel Telles de Vasconcelos (or Manuel Telles Barreto), according to Barros). Lopo Soares leaves Manuel Telles with three (possibly four) ships: one nau, and two caravels, under the commands of Diogo Pires and Pêro Rafael (and possibly Cristovão Jusarte (Lisuarte Pereira?)), all veterans of the battle of Cochin. Lopo Soares annexes what remains of the earlier fleets (e.g., Diogo Fernandes Pereira, Antonio de Saldanha, etc.) into the returning 6th Armada. Overall, Lopo Soares is bringing back to Lisbon two more ships than he left with.

=== Battle of Pandarane ===
On December 31, 1504, the 6th Armada first headed north from Cochin intending to dock briefly at the port of Ponnani, so that Soares could pay his respects to Portugal's new ally, the raja of Tanur. While negotiating entry at the port (Ponnani was not part of Tanur, which lies further inland), Soares received a message that a large Arab-Egyptian transport fleet ('Moors from Cairo and Mecca') - some 17 Arab ships with 4000 men - had arrived at Pandarane (Pantalyini Kollam), a spacious service port just north of Calicut.

The Egyptian fleet had not come on a military mission, but to evacuate expatriate Arab merchants and their families from Calicut and bring them home to Egypt and Arabia. Calculating that the ships were probably loaded with the evacuating rich families' valuable belongings and treasures, Soares could not resist the temptation. His naus were too loaded with spices to maneouver properly, so Lopo Soares sent them on to Cannanore then attacked the Egyptian transport fleet at Pandarane with just two caravels and 15 Malabari bateis, loaded with around 360 Portuguese soldiers. This bold venture trapped the Egyptian fleet in Pandarane harbor and in the subsequent ferocious battle, Soares succeeded in capturing and plundering the ships, killing some 2,000 defenders in the process. Portuguese casualties were 23 dead and 170 wounded–about half the force–and more than Duarte Pacheco's losses in all his encounters at Cochin a few months earlier.

== Return Voyage ==
Early January, 1505 - After a brief stop in Cannanore, Lopo Soares and the 6th Armada set sail back across the Indian Ocean.

February 1, 1505 - The 6th Armada arrives at Malindi. Here they pick up some of the booty António de Saldanha and Rui Lourenço Ravasco had deposited from their predatory ventures around East Africa and Cape Guardafui the previous year.

February 10, 1505 - The 6th Armada arrives at Kilwa, where Lopo Soares announces his intention to collect the yearly tribute from the city due to King Manuel I of Portugal (imposed by Vasco da Gama back in 1502.) But the ruling Emir Ibrahim refuses. Lopo Soares, his ships too loaded to risk damage in a confrontation, decides to sail on.

Mid-February, 1505 - The 6th Armada makes a stop in Mozambique Island for repair and re-supply. Realizing it is going to be a two-week stay, Lopo Soares dispatches two ships - Pêro de Mendonça and Lopo de Abreu - ahead of him to Lisbon to announce the results. Pêro de Mendonça's ship will be lost somewhere after Cape Correntes, probably capsized on the South African coast, and will never be heard from again. Lopo de Abreu will arrive in Lisbon in mid-July.

July 22, 1505 - About nine days after Lopo de Abreu's arrival, Lopo Soares de Albergaria main fleet arrives in Lisbon. Save for Pêro de Mendonça, the fleet is intact. The 6th Armada's cargo is noted by contemporaries as one of the best ones yet brought back from India. Even more well-received is the person of Duarte Pacheco Pereira, whose exploits Lopo de Abreu had already related to the royal court. King Manuel I of Portugal orders an elaborate reception and public celebrations to honor of the hero of Cochin.

== Aftermath ==
Overall, the 6th Armada was a success. Notwithstanding the casualties at Pandarane and the loss of Pêro de Mendonça's ship, it was a comparatively successful run. The cargo was particularly splendid, the military achievements - Cochin, Cranganore, Tanur - strategically important. The particular news about Socotra island - discovered by Diogo Fernandes Pereira in late 1502, but who was only now returning to report it - was also highly valued.

1504 was the year where the old order on the Malabar coast was finally broken - the Zamorin's authority was fragmenting, the Arab merchants were fleeing, Portuguese allies were no longer tentative and few, but confident and growing. The question for the Portuguese was no longer 'how can we break into the spice trade?', but 'we have broken it, now what?'. The Portuguese seemed to now have a chance to write the next chapter of the history of Kerala and the spice trade. And the next fleet, the 7th Armada sent out in the Spring of 1505 under D. Francisco de Almeida, very much intended to write it.

For the Zamorin, 1504 was a veritable nightmare. The humiliations at Cochin, the destruction of Cranganore, the defections of his vassals, permanently changed the landscape of Kerala, and his prospects for survival. His strategy of trying to force the Portuguese to peace on his terms, to behave like other foreign merchants, to respect the existing order, had backfired dramatically.

Lopo Soares's destruction of the Arab-Egyptian fleet at Pandarane must also have seemed like a blow to the Zamorin. He had urgently hoped to cajole the Mameluke Sultanate to come to his aid and help him bring the misbehaving Portuguese to heel. After Pandarane, the Zamorin feared the Arabs might not wish to risk such losses again, and might just leave Calicut out to dry. But his fears of abandonment were misplaced, for at this very moment preparations were being launched in Cairo to strike back at the Portuguese forcefully. The Mameluke sultan Al-Ashraf Qansuh al-Ghawri of Egypt had thus far taken a largely passive stance to the Portuguese havoc in his rear, e.g. evacuating his nationals from India, widening the port of Jeddah to shelter Muslim ships chased by Portuguese pirates. But the repeated appeals by the Zamorin of Calicut, backed up by the rulers of Gujarat, Aden, Kilwa, and the Venetian Republic were growing deafening. His own ministers must have pointed out how badly the Portuguese adventurers were hurting the Sultan's treasury - all the customs dues and taxes being lost by the Portuguese disruption of the Red Sea spice trade and the Mecca pilgrim traffic. In late 1504, the Mameluke Sultan of Egypt was finally persuaded that more active measures must be taken - not merely to get the Portuguese to behave, but to drive them out of the Indian Ocean altogether. (see Portuguese–Mamluk naval war)

== See also ==
- Portuguese India Armadas
- First Luso-Malabarese War
  - Battle of Cochin (1504)

== Sources ==
- João de Barros (1552–59) Décadas da Ásia: Dos feitos, que os Portuguezes fizeram no descubrimento, e conquista, dos mares, e terras do Oriente.. Dec. I, Lib 7.
- Fernão Lopes de Castanheda (1551–1560) História do descobrimento & conquista da Índia pelos portugueses [1833 edition]
- Gaspar Correia (c.1550s) Lendas da Índia, first pub. 1858–64, in Lisbon: Academia Real das Sciencias.
- Damião de Góis (1566–67) Crónica do Felicíssimo Rei D. Manuel
- Jerónimo Osório (1586) De rebus Emmanuelis [trans. 1752 by J. Gibbs as The History of the Portuguese during the Reign of Emmanuel London: Millar]

Secondary

- Bouchon, G. (1976) "Le premier voyage de Lopo Soares en Inde, 1504-05", Mare Luso-Indicum, publication du Centre d'Études Islamiques et Orientales d'Histoire Comparée (Équipe de recherche associée au CNRS nº 206) et du Centre d'Études Portugaises de l'École Pratique des Hautes Études, IVe section, Vol. 3.
- Dames, M.L. (1918) "Introduction" in An Account Of The Countries Bordering On The Indian Ocean And Their Inhabitants, Vol. 1 (Engl. transl. of Livro de Duarte de Barbosa), 2005 reprint, New Delhi: Asian Education Services.
- Danvers, F.C. (1894) The Portuguese in India, being a history of the rise and decline of their eastern empire. 2 vols, London: Allen.
- Ferguson, D. (1907) "The Discovery of Ceylon by the Portuguese in 1506", Journal of the Ceylon Branch of the Royal Asiatic Society, Vol. 19, No. 59 p. 284-400 offprint
- Logan, W. (1887) Malabar Manual, 2004 reprint, New Delhi: Asian Education Services.
- Mathew, K.S. (1997) "Indian Naval Encounters with the Portuguese: Strengths and weaknesses", in Kurup, editor, India's Naval Traditions. New Delhi: Northern Book Centre.
- Pedroso, S. J. (1881) Resumo historico ácerca da antiga India Portugueza Lisbon: Castro Irmão
- Quintella, Ignaco da Costa (1839–40) Annaes da Marinha Portugueza, 2 vols, Lisbon: Academia Real das Sciencias.
- Subrahmanyam, S. (1997) The Career and Legend of Vasco da Gama. Cambridge, UK: Cambridge University Press.
- Whiteway, R. S. (1899) The Rise of Portuguese Power in India, 1497–1550. Westminster: Constable.

Preceded by 5th Armada (Afonso de Albuquerque, 1503)	Portuguese India Armada; 6th Armada (1504)	Succeeded by 7th Armada (D. Francisco de Almeida, 1505)
