= António de Saldanha =

European seafarer, made first recorded ascent of Table Mountain, South Africa

Captain Antonio de Saldanha

Captain of Sofala-Mozambique
- In office 1509
- Preceded by: Vasco Gomes se Abreu
- Succeeded by: Simão de Miranda de Azevedo

Personal details
- Born: Before 1490 Saldaña?, Castille, Kingdom of Portugal
- Spouse: Joana de Mendonça
- Children: Aires de Saldanha; João de Saldanha (General of Armada)

António de Saldanha was a Castilian-Portuguese 16th-century captain. He was the first European to set anchor in what is now called Table Bay, South Africa, and made the first recorded ascent of Table Mountain.

== Background ==
Chroniclers Gaspar Correia (p. 412) and Fernão Lopes de Castanheda (p. 157) identify António de Saldanha as a "Castilian nobleman" who arrived in Portugal around 1497, in the household service of the queen Maria of Aragon. His original Castilian name is unknown, 'Saldanha' possibly referring to the Castilian town of Saldaña, which may have been his place of origin.

== Expedition of 1503 ==
Being a man of "some nautical experience", Saldanha was appointed to head a squad of three vessels, part of Afonso de Albuquerque's fleet bound for India to reinforce the Portuguese settlement at Cochin. Although accompanying the India fleet, Saldanha's squad was said to have been given separate instructions to patrol the mouth of the Red Sea, and prey on Arab shipping.

Saldanha's three-ship squad (himself, Rui Lourenço Ravasco and Diogo Fernandes Pereira) set out of Lisbon in early May 1503, intending to catch up with Albuquerque's main fleet, which had gone on ahead. Poor pilotage, however, led to numerous errors. The squad mistakenly sailed into the Gulf of Guinea, Saldanha and Lourenço alighting near São Tomé, with no idea where their third ship might be (Diogo Fernandes was actually on the proper track, sailing on alone). The remaining two began to make their way painfully south along the African coast, against the contrary winds and currents. Somewhere along the way, Saldanha and Lourenço lost sight of each other as well.

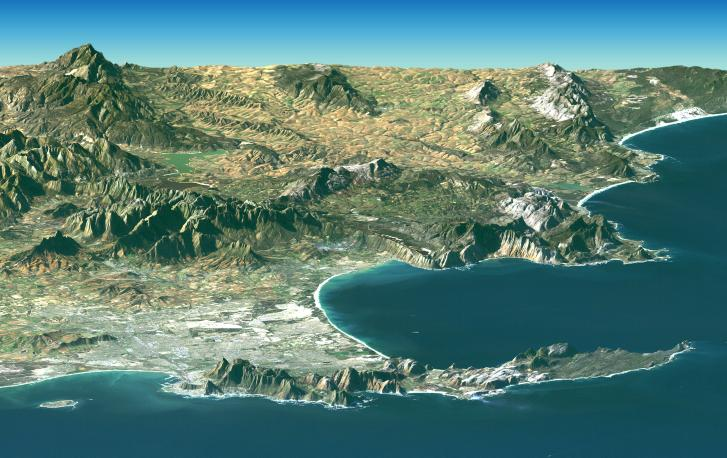
Cape Town: Table Bay (left), Cape Point peninsula (right) and False Bay (behind)

Again, by poor piloting, Saldanha miscalculated his Cape crossing, and ended up making landfall just north of the Cape of Good Hope. To check if the cape had been surpassed, Saldanha anchored in the hitherto unknown Table Bay, and went ashore. Saldanha thus became the first European to set foot in what was to become modern Cape Town. Saldanha climbed the flat-topped mountain adjacent to the bay and identified the tip of the Cape (Cape Point) further to the south. He named the peak Table Mountain and (legend has it that he and his men) carved a cross in the rock of a nearby formation, traces of which can still be found on Lion's Head today. Saldanha replenished his water supplies at a local watering hole (he also got into a brief skirmish with local Khoikhoi and was slightly wounded), before returning to his ship.

Table Bay was promptly named Aguada de Saldanha (Saldanha's watering stop) by Portuguese 16th-century cartographers. In 1601 a Dutch seafarer and cartographer, Joris van Spilbergen identified a bay further to the north of the Cape as Aguada de Saldanha. Henceforth this location became known as Saldanha Bay and the place where Saldanha anchored was renamed Table Bay.

Events from here are a bit obscure. It seems after multiple attempts, Saldanha finally doubled the cape, but his ship was in sufficiently poor shape to force him to put into Mossel Bay for repair. A note left at that watering hole says he was still there in October, 1503. During this interlude, Rui Lourenço Ravasco was actually waiting for him in Mozambique Island. With no sign of Saldanha, Lourenço entertained himself with some freelance piracy on the East African coast, capturing ships off Kilwa and reducing Zanzibar and Barawa to tribute, and battling against Mombassa (who were besieging the Portuguese-allied Malindi). Diogo Fernandes, with still no idea where the others were, was waiting patiently in the mouth of the Red Sea by himself.

Saldanha finally left South Africa and caught up with Lourenço Ravasco at Malindi. They proceeded together to force a treaty on Mombassa, before heading up to the Red Sea. Saldanha and Lourenço Ravasco spent the winter of 1503-04 around Cape Guardafui, capturing numerous Arab merchant ships. They were completely ignorant that Diogo Fernandes was just nearby, quietly wintering by himself at the island of Socotra.

In the Spring of 1504, entrusting much of their stolen treasures to the safekeeping of the King of Malindi, Saldanha and Lourenço Ravasco sailed across the Indian Ocean to India. But badly battered, they were forced to stop for a long period of repairs and rest at Anjediva island, apparently unaware that, at the very moment, a desperate battle was being fought at Cochin, between the small Portuguese garrison and the large army of the Zamorin of Calicut.

In September, 1504, Saldanha and Lourenço Ravasco were found by 6th India Armada, under the command of Lopo Soares de Albergaria, who helped them finish their repairs, annexed them into his fleet and proceeded down to Cochin. Saldanha participated in several actions in India in late 1504, notably the razing of Cranganore in October.

In January, 1505, Saldanha joined the return fleet back to Lisbon. The fleet stopped by Malindi to pick up his deposited treasure and arrived in Lisbon in July.

== Passenger in 1506 ==
According to João de Barros, António de Saldanha returned to the Indian Ocean in 1506, with the 8th Armada under Tristão da Cunha, albeit not as a captain of his own ship. He came principally as a navigator, to help guide the Red Sea-bound squad of Afonso de Albuquerque around Cape Guardafui.

In late 1506/early 1507, when the fleet was lingering in Mozambique Island waiting for favorable winds, the admiral Tristão da Cunha placed his own flagship, the Sant' Iago, under the temporary command of Saldanha, while he went off on some exploratory expeditions on the African coast in a smaller boat.

Cunha soon came across the Flor de la Mar, the ship of João da Nova, who, on the return from India the previous year, had sprung a bad leak and been forced to stop for repairs. The spice cargo was transferred to another ship (unnamed) and placed under the command of Antonio de Saldanha, with instructions to sail it safely back to Lisbon.

It is said that Saldanha did stop by Saldanha Bay (the modern one, not Table Bay) on the return journey.

== Captain of Sofala-Mozambique (1509) ==
In 1509, António de Saldanha was appointed for a three-year term as captain-major of Sofala and Mozambique Island (East Africa), succeeding the late Vasco Gomes de Abreu. He set out in the Spring of 1509 as a passenger with the 11th Armada under D. Fernando Coutinho, and was deposited at Mozambique Island in August, and took . During his tenure there, Saldanha helped oversee the dismantling of the Portuguese fort at Kilwa (Quiloa) in 1511.

In 1512, his term in Sofala-Mozambique finished, António de Saldanha was relieved by the new governor Simão de Miranda de Azevedo, who arrived in October. Saldanha took charge of Miranda's ship for the return to Lisbon.

== Issue ==
- Aires de Saldanha - Viceroy of India and Governor of Tangiers

== In memoriam ==
- Saldanha Bay in South Africa was named after the explorer.

== See also ==
- 5th Portuguese India Armada (Albuquerque, 1503)

== Sources ==
- João de Barros (1552–59) Décadas da Ásia: Dos feitos, que os Portuguezes fizeram no descubrimento, e conquista, dos mares, e terras do Oriente.. Vol. 3 (Dec. II, Lib.1-5)
- Gaspar Correia (c. 1550s) Lendas da Índia, first pub. 1858–1864, Lisbon: Academia Real de Sciencias Vol. 1;
- Fernão Lopes de Castanheda (1551–1560) História do descobrimento & conquista da Índia pelos portugueses [1833 edition] Lib 1, Ch. 55
- Danvers, F.C. (1894) The Portuguese in India, being a history of the rise and decline of their eastern empire. 2 vols, London: Allen.
- Theal, G.M. (1902) The Beginning of South African History. London: popo
