= Diogo Fernandes Pereira =

Early 16th-century Portuguese explorer

- Born: 15th century Setúbal, Kingdom of Portugal
- Died: 16th century Unknown
- Occupations: Explorer, navigator
- Known for: First European to visit the island of Socotra in 1503 and the discoverer of the Mascarenes archipelago. First European to sail east of Madagascar island ('outer route' to the East Indies)

Diogo Fernandes Pereira, sometimes called simply Diogo Fernandes, was a Portuguese 16th-century navigator, originally from Setúbal, Portugal. Diogo Fernandes was the first known European captain to visit the island of Socotra in 1503 and the discoverer of the Mascarenes archipelago (Réunion, Mauritius, and Rodrigues) in 1507. He may also have been the first European to sail east of Madagascar island ('outer route' to the East Indies).

== Background ==
Diogo Fernandes Pereira's name is usually given simply as 'Diogo Fernandes'. He is sometimes referred to as Diogo Fernandes de Setúbal (his hometown), to distinguish him from another Indian Ocean adventurer of that period with a similar name, known as Diogo Fernandes de Beja. In older chronicles, (e.g. Damião de Góis) his name is also written as Diogo Fernandes 'Piteira' or 'Peteira'.

Diogo Fernandes was a Portuguese seaman of obscure background. According to João de Barros, he was "a native of Setúbal, a man used to the sea" (muito usado no mar). He served as master on several ships - that is, as third officer, below the pilot and captain, a position which required trained navigational expertise, and may have served as pilot on other occasions.

== Outer Route and Socotra (1503) ==
In 1503, Diogo Fernandes Pereira was appointed master and captain (a very unusual combination) of a Setúbal ship bound for India. How a master was elevated to captain of an India nau (usually a position reserved for nobles or wealthy men who 'paid' for the privilege) is uncertain. One possible conjecture is that the ship was not a crown ship, but a privately outfitted ship.

In some secondary accounts, it is said that Diogo Fernandes's ship was named Setúbal. That is almost certainly incorrect. Known lists for the armada and the chronicles do not actually give his ship a name, but just call it "the ship from/of Setúbal", a strong suggestion that it might have been privately outfitted by the merchant community of the city of Setúbal. If so, that might better explain how Diogo Fernandes got to be captain - the merchants of Setúbal just naturally chose to entrust their capital in their most knowledgeable and experienced native son.

Diogo Fernandes's Setúbal ship was made part of the 5th Portuguese India Armada of Afonso de Albuquerque. Fernandes was originally assigned to the third squadron of that fleet, under the vice-admiral António de Saldanha. But navigational errors (on Saldanha's part) led to the separation of the ships shortly after Cape Verde. Diogo Fernandes was forced to sail on alone.

The chronicler Gaspar Correia (p. 418) claims that after doubling the Cape of Good Hope by himself, Fernandes did not turn into the Mozambique Channel, but rather pushed east, sailing under the island of Madagascar, and then turned north, sailing up east of Madagascar. This would make him the first known ship to sail the 'outer route' to the East Indies. (Although there remains the possibility that Diogo Dias also did precisely that in 1500.)

Although Correia's account is not corroborated by other chroniclers, Diogo Fernandes Pereira seems to almost certainly have missed Mozambique Island, the usual collection point for Portuguese ships, and where one of his squadron, Rui Lourenço Ravasco, was known to be waiting. Instead, we next hear of Fernandes up near Cape Guardafui, which strongly suggests that he did take the outer route, as, sailing north by that route, he would not have sighted African coast before the horn.

Around Cape Guardafui, Diogo Fernandes stumbled on the island of Socotra sometime in late 1503. Although the island was long known to eastern merchants (Socotra aloe was a highly valued balm in the markets of Arabia and India), it was unknown to the Portuguese. Diogo Fernandes was also surprised to encounter a strong (Syriac) Christian community on the island (after all, this was a predominantly Muslim region). Diogo Fernandes spent the winter in Socotra, before crossing the Indian Ocean (again by himself) in early 1504.

Diogo Fernandes arrived in India just as the Zamorin of Calicut was launching an invasion of Portuguese-allied Cochin. During the ferocious Battle of Cochin (1504), the commander of the Portuguese garrison, Duarte Pacheco Pereira, is said to have placed a certain 'Diogo Pereira' (possibly Diogo Fernandes?) in charge of the nau Concepção, protecting the city.

== Mascarenes (1507) ==
Diogo Fernandes returned to Portugal in 1505. His report on Socotra generated much excitement in the Portuguese court. The strategic placement of the island at the mouth of the Red Sea made it an optimal location to station a Portuguese patrol. It could prey on Arab shipping and shut down the competing spice trade through that route. The existence of the isolated Christian community only made it even more appealing (the Portuguese had long hoped to find a Christian port of call in the Muslim-dominated Indian Ocean). Plans were immediately launched to outfit a squadron, under the command of Afonso de Albuquerque, to seize the island for Portugal.

The Socotra squadron was adjoined to the 8th Armada of 1506 led by Tristão da Cunha. Diogo Fernandes himself sailed on it, albeit only as a master of Albuquerque's ship, the Cisne ('the Swan', usually transcribed as Cirné).

In late 1506, when the 8th Armada made the usual stop in Mozambique Island, the admiral Tristão da Cunha ordered a pause in the expedition to explore the island of Madagascar (then known as the ilha de São Lourenço). During this interlude, it is speculated that Albuquerque (uninterested in such exploratory ventures) elected to stay in Mozambique, and temporarily passed his ship, the Cirné, over to the command of the master Diogo Fernandes Pereira.

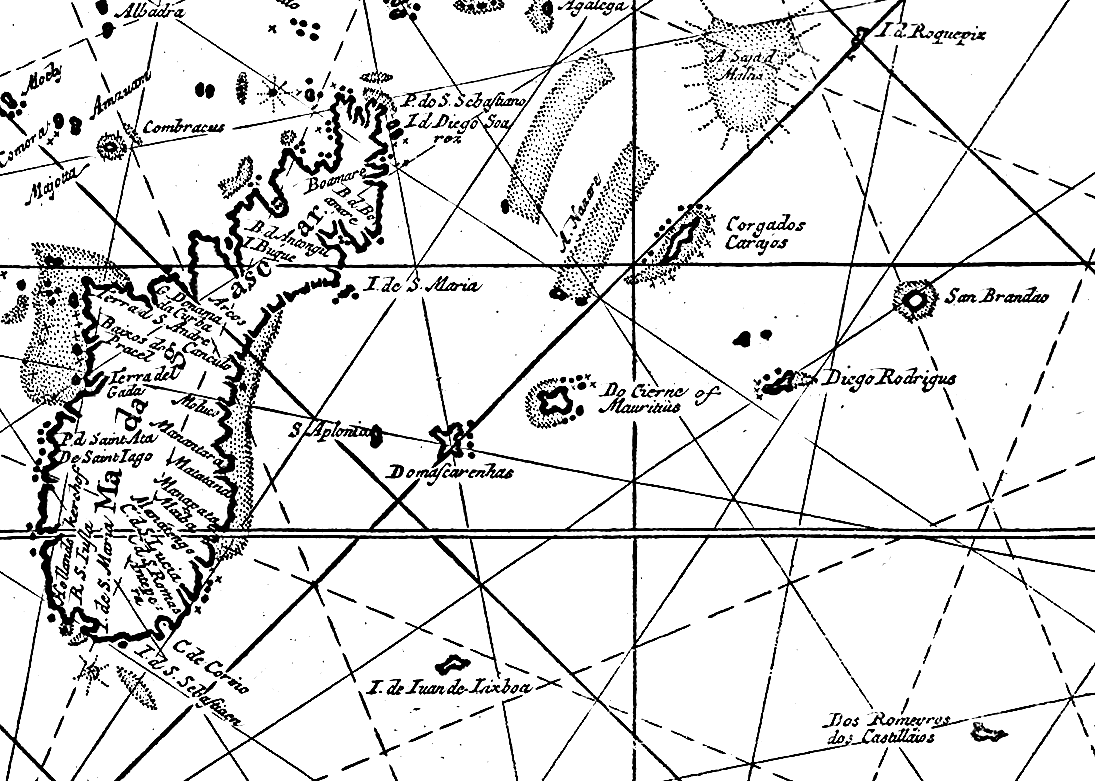
Detail of Mascarenes islands from a Dutch map of 1689, with some of the earlier names of the islands.

Diogo Fernandes is said to have struck a wide arc east of Madagascar and stumbled upon the island of Réunion, which he promptly named ilha de Santa Apollonia (in honor of the St. Apollonia whose day it was, February 9, 1507). He proceeded east to discover the island of Mauritius, which he named ilha do Cirne (the name of his ship). From there Fernandes went further east and discovered the island now known as Rodrigues, but which at the time was named on maps as the ilha de Diogo Fernandes, Domigo Friz or Domingo Frias (the latter two probably just poor cartographic transcriptions or abbreviations of 'Diogo Fernandes'). He is said to have stopped for water at the first and third islands, before returning to Mozambique.

Diogo Fernandes island ('Domigo Friz') was visited by Diogo Lopes de Sequeira in 1509 and the name 'Don Galopes' (another transcribed abbreviation) sometimes appears for that island in some maps. It went through its final name change, to Rodrigues island much later, after another Portuguese explorer Diogo Rodrigues visited the area in 1528.

The entire archipelago was named the Mascarenes islands, after D. Pedro Mascarenhas, who visited the islands in 1512, following up on Sequeira's report.

== Afterwards ==
After returning from his Mascarene jaunt, Diogo Fernandes Pereira went on to participate with Albuquerque in the conquest of Socotra that summer. We have no more records of him afterwards. If Diogo Fernandes remained aboard the Cirne after Socotra, he would have participated in the battle of Hormuz in the Fall of 1507, but we have no record of him there. More importantly, we have no record of his participation (or non-participation) in the mutiny against Albuquerque at Hormuz. We do know Albuquerque elevated a certain 'Dinis Fernandes' to replace one of the mutinous captains; and we also know a certain 'Diogo Pereira' was involved in presenting the mutinous captains' petition to the vice-roy in Cochin. But there is no evidence or suggestion that either of these men can be identified with Diogo Fernandes Pereira.

== Sources ==
- Gaspar Correia (c. 1550s) Lendas da Índia, pub. 1858-64, Lisbon: Academia Real de Sciencias
- Costa, J.P. (1973) "Socotorá e o Domínio Português No Oriente", Revista da Universidade de Coimbra, Vol.23 offprint
- Le Guat, François (1891) The voyage of François Le Guat of Bresse, to Rodriguez, Mauritius, Java, and the Cape of Good Hope, Vol. 2, Engl. trans., London: Halykut Society
- Quintella, Ignaco da Costa (1839) Annaes da Marinha Portugueza, Lisbon: Academia Real das Sciencias.

== See also ==
- 5th Portuguese India Armada (Albuquerque, 1503)
- 8th Portuguese India Armada (Cunha, 1506)
- Exploration of Asia
