= Nicolau Coelho =

Portuguese navigator and explorer

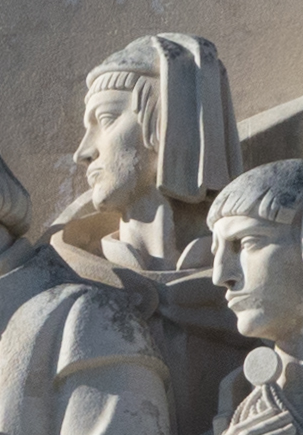
- Effigy of Nicolau Coelho in the Monument of the Discoveries, in Lisbon, Portugal
- Born: c. 1460; Felgueiras, Kingdom of Portugal
- Died: 1504; Off the coast of Mozambique
- Occupations: Explorer, navigator

Nicolau Coelho (c. 1460, in Felgueiras – 1504, off the coast of Mozambique) was an expert Portuguese navigator and explorer during the Age of Discovery. He participated in the discovery of the route to India by Vasco da Gama, where he commanded Berrio, the first caravel to return; he was captain of a ship in the fleet headed by Pedro Álvares Cabral, who landed in Brazil. He died at sea, possibly off the coast of Mozambique, while returning from India in the 5th Portuguese Armada with Francisco de Albuquerque.

== Biography ==
Nicolau Coelho (c. 1460–1504) was presumably born in Felgueiras in northern Portugal. He was the son of Pedro Coelho and either Luísa de Góis or Inês de Ataíde, depending on the genealogical source. He married Brites Rodrigues de Brito sometime before 1495 and had several children: Nicolau, Francisco, Joana, Jorge, and Leonor.

Nicolau Coelho was a Portuguese explorer and one of the three captains (along with Paulo da Gama and Gonçalo Nunes) who accompanied Vasco da Gama in the Discovery of the sea route to India on 8 July 1497. He was the captain of the Berrio during this exploration and had as his navigator, Pêro Escobar. He was the first of Gama's captains to reach Mozambique and establish contact with the sultan of Quiloa. He was also the first of Gama's armada to arrive in Lisbon, on 10 July 1499 where King Manuel I of Portugal bestowed to him a pension of 50,000 reis per year, 30,000 in interest for his lands and his descendants and a new coat of arms. He was made Knight of the Royal House (Cavaleiro da Casa Real) that same year.

On 9 March 1500, he accompanied Pedro Álvares Cabral in the discovery of Brazil, being one of the captains of the fleet of 13 ships. After landing in Brazil, the fleet resumed its voyage east on 3 May 1500, whereupon they were struck by a great storm near the Cape of Good Hope, losing 4 vessels. They continued with stops in modern-day Mozambique, Kenya, and Tanzania before finally reaching Calicut in India on 13 September 1500. The fleet returned to Lisbon on 23 June 1501. Cabral arrived back home with only 4 of the original 13 ships. Coelho left Portugal for a third time on 14 April 1503, as captain of the "Faial" with the armada of Afonso de Albuquerque, but died while returning home to Portugal in January 1504 along with Francisco de Albuquerque, Afonso's cousin, near the shallows of São Lázaro, modern-day Quirimbas Islands, Mozambique.

== See also ==
- Exploration of Asia
