= Aires de Saldanha =

Aires de Albuquerque e Saldanha
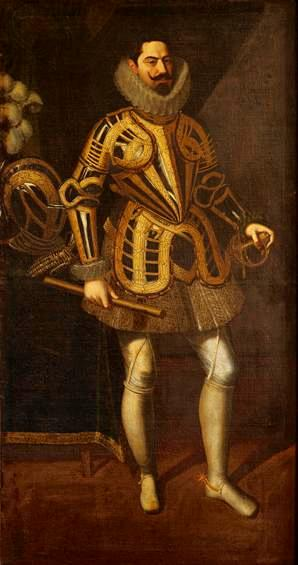
- Portrait of D. Aires de Saldanha; 1591

Viceroy of Portuguese India
- In office 1600–1605

Governor of Tangiers
- In office 17 June 1591 – 24 August 1599

Personal details
- Born: 10 May 1542 Santarém, Kingdom of Portugal
- Died: 19 August 1605 (aged 63) Portuguese Empire

Aires de Saldanha (Santarém, Portugal, 10 May 1542 - Terceira, 19 August 1605) was a Portuguese soldier. He was the son of António de Saldanha, military and navigator who discovered the bay of Saldanha. He went to Portuguese India in 1558, with the viceroy Constantino of Braganza, this time serving for twelve years in the region.

== Captain and Governor ==
He returned to Portugal in 1570, where he married Joana de Albuquerque, soon after he returned to India, this time with the Viceroy Rui Lourenço de Távora. He was appointed captain of Portuguese Malacca, where he built the fort of Tidor. Returning to Portugal, he was appointed governor of Tangier, a position he held for 9 years.

== Viceroy ==
In 1600, he was named 17th Viceroy of India and 34th Governor of India. During his viceroyalty, in addition to financial difficulties, had to struggle against the Dutch on several fronts, defending Cochim and Goa, and repel them in the Moluccas.

== Death ==
He died during his return to Portugal, near the island of Terceira, being first buried in Angra do Heroísmo, after his body was moved to Santarém.
