= Elias Mocatta =

British merchant and financier (1798–1881)

Elias Mocatta (1798–1881) was a British merchant and financier, significant in the early credit history of Venezuela and other South American countries.

== Early life ==
Mocatta was born on 16 February 1798, and was from a Bristol background. He is recorded as born in London. In a Sephardic family, he was an older brother of Isaac Lindo Mocatta, who was involved in his Venezuelan enterprise in the 1840s, and of David Alfred Mocatta, and son of Moses Mocatta (1768–1857).

== In Venezuela ==
Mocatta spent about 15 years in Venezuela, c.1821 to c.1836, and retained long-term financial connections there. He was in Caracas from 1825, and welcomed Simón Bolívar there on behalf of the expatriates in 1827.

=== Political and financial background ===
During this period Gran Colombia broke up into the republics of Colombia (initially as the Republic of New Granada), Ecuador and Venezuela. Mocatta was still involved in managing the affairs of the external debt of Gran Colombia, as divided up between the republics, in the 1850s, acting for the creditors. Also at this period the Foreign Funds market in London flourished briefly and speculatively, launched in 1823 and suffering a crash in 1825. Moses Mocatta was involved in it, and became one of the "Spanish bondholders" group lobbying in 1827 for the London Stock Exchange to handle and regulate foreign bond dealings. Unification of the Foreign Funds and Stock Exchange trading took place in steps, completed by 1835.

=== Commerce ===
The expatriate British in Caracas and La Guaira were not numerous, but they were commercially influential . One of Elias Mocatta's associates was John Boulton (1805–1875) (see es:Familia Boulton), a major business figure in early Venezuelan history: Boulton gave Mocatta a power of attorney in 1827. Powles, Ward, Lord & Co. of La Guaira were important in commerce, with George Ward and Henry Joseph Lord acting for John Diston Powles and London partners.

Mocatta acted for Mocatta & Co. of Liverpool in commercial matters and handled letters of credit. He built up business relationships with Boulton and Powles trading houses, in La Guaira. He is found in business in Caracas from 1825, firstly with the sale of a vessel. He was Caracas agent for Powles, Ward, Hurry & Co. from 1826 to 1830, and acted also for other firms. E. Mocatta & Co. of La Guaira was set up around 1830. His brother Samuel was in Venezuela in the 1820s, and became involved in the business.

=== Social life ===
Socially, the Mocatta family were on good terms with Robert Ker Porter in Caracas, and Aizenberg comments that it is possible to reconstruct much of their life there from his diary. The Mocatta family also became close to Robert's sister, the famous novelist Jane Porter, author of Thaddeus of Warsaw (1803) and The Scottish Chiefs (1810).

== Later life ==
The partnership of Elias Mocatta, Isaac Lindo Mocatta and Samuel Mocatta was dissolved in 1843. They were commission merchants in Liverpool, and traded as Mocatta Brothers in La Guaira. In 1844 Mocatta became Ecuadorian consul in Liverpool. In October 1847, Messrs. Mocatta & Son, in trade with La Guaira, were reported to have stopped, with liabilities of £50,000.

Noting his relationship to Moses, Flandreau points out Mocatta's activity on bondholders' committees for Spanish bonds (1851), Ecuadorian bonds (1853), and Greek bonds (1863). Around 1850 he was involved as shareholder in the Marmato Company floated by John Diston Powles. In 1852 he was in Ecuador, as a new representative of a bondholder committee. He arranged a debt moratorium of 20 years, based on vacant land.

In 1862, towards the end of the Federal War in Venezuela, Mocatta worked with Hilarión Nadal to help promote a Barings Bank loan to the Venezuelan government. He was subsequently appointed special agent to Barings, to deal with the transition to the post-war administration. In the negotiations for a further loan of 1864, Mocatta worked closely with the House of Boulton.

In 1864 Mocatta was one of the founders of the London and Venezuela Bank, with Henry Alers Hankey, Frederick Hemming, Alfred Powles, Giacomo Servadio, Robert Syers and David Wilson. In 1868 he retired from the management of the bank.

In the census of 1881, the year of his death, he was recorded at North Meols, in Lancashire.

== Family ==
He married Julia De Leon, daughter of J De Leon of St Thomas, West Indies.

Their children included:

- Maurice Mocatta, born 1821 on St Thomas. At that time his father was trading between the island and La Guaira. He was sent to Liverpool in 1827, and was educated in Brighton and then at the Liverpool Royal Institution. He became a stockbroker.
- William Abraham Mocatta (1830–1876), an Anglican cleric, the seventh son, born in Caracas.
- Louisa, the second daughter, who married in 1860, at Hove, Frederic Charles Danvers.
