= Diogo Lopes de Sequeira =

Governor of Portuguese India

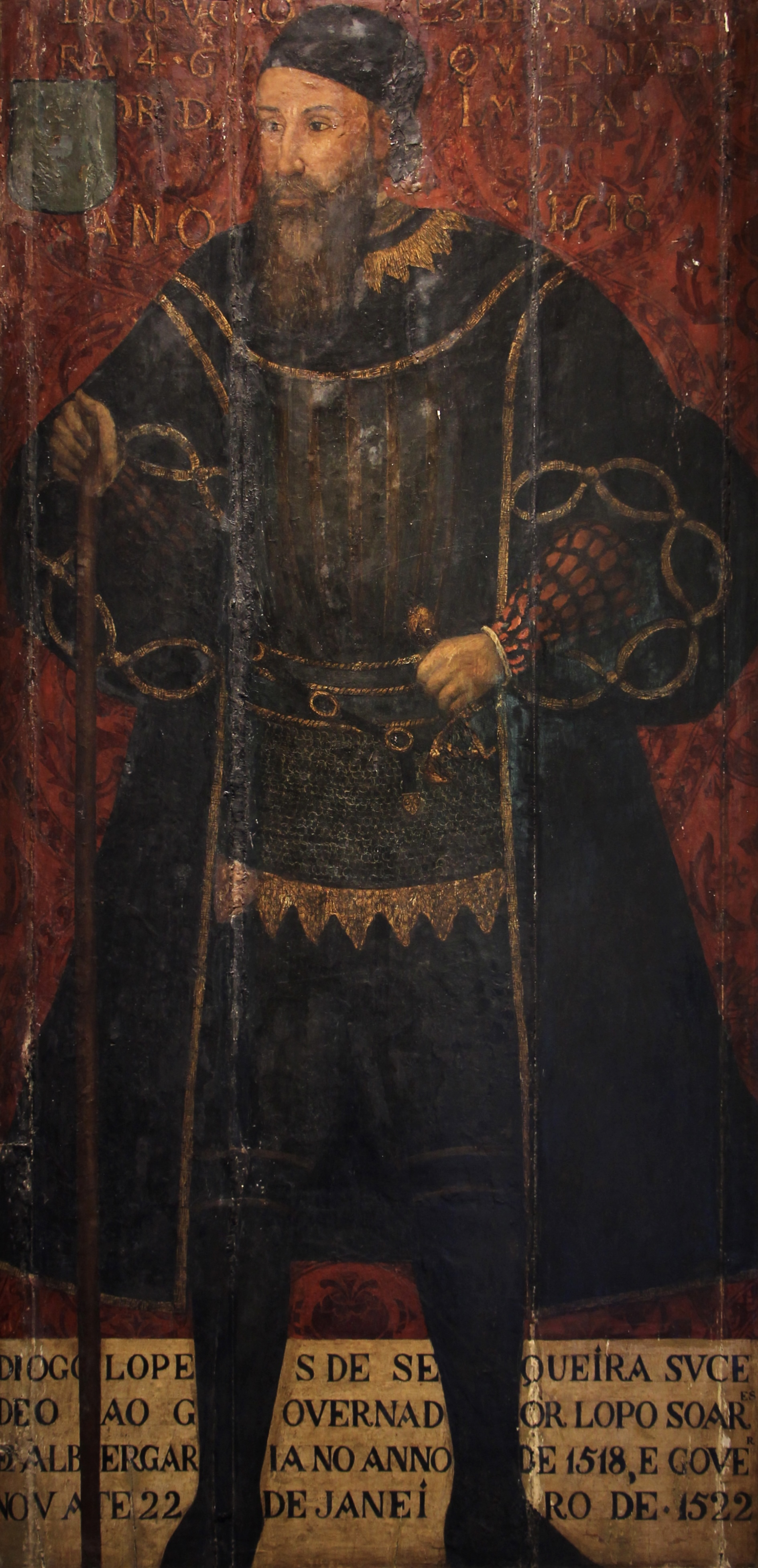

Captain-major of Gold Coast
- In office 1503?–1506?
- Monarch: Manuel I
- Preceded by: Fernão Lopes Correia
- Succeeded by: António de Bobadilha

Governor of India
- In office 1518–1522
- Monarchs: Manuel I John III
- Preceded by: Lopo Soares de Albergaria
- Succeeded by: Duarte de Meneses

Personal details
- Born: 1465 Alandroal, Kingdom of Portugal
- Died: 1530 (aged 65) Alandroal, Kingdom of Portugal

Diogo Lopes de Sequeira (1465–1530) was a Portuguese fidalgo, sent to analyze the trade potential in Madagascar and Malacca. He arrived at Malacca on 11 September 1509 and left the next year when he discovered that Sultan Mahmud Shah was planning his assassination. This gave Afonso de Albuquerque the opportunity to embark upon his expedition of conquests.

Sequeira was subsequently made governor of Portuguese India (1518–1522), and in 1520 led a military campaign into the Red Sea which hastened the first legitimate Portuguese embassy to Ethiopia.

== See also ==
- Portuguese Malacca
- Portuguese India

Preceded by Lopo Soares de Albergaria	Governor of Portuguese India; 1518–1522	Succeeded by Duarte de Menezes
