= Cristóvão de Távora =

Portuguese colonial administrator

Cristóvão de Távora was a Portuguese colonial administrator. He was granted the captaincy of the Fortress of Sofala in Portuguese Mozambique from 1508 until 1514. He was then Captain of Mozambique from 31 July 1515 to 1 July 1518.
