= Duarte Pacheco Pereira =

Portuguese explorer (c. 1460 – 1533)

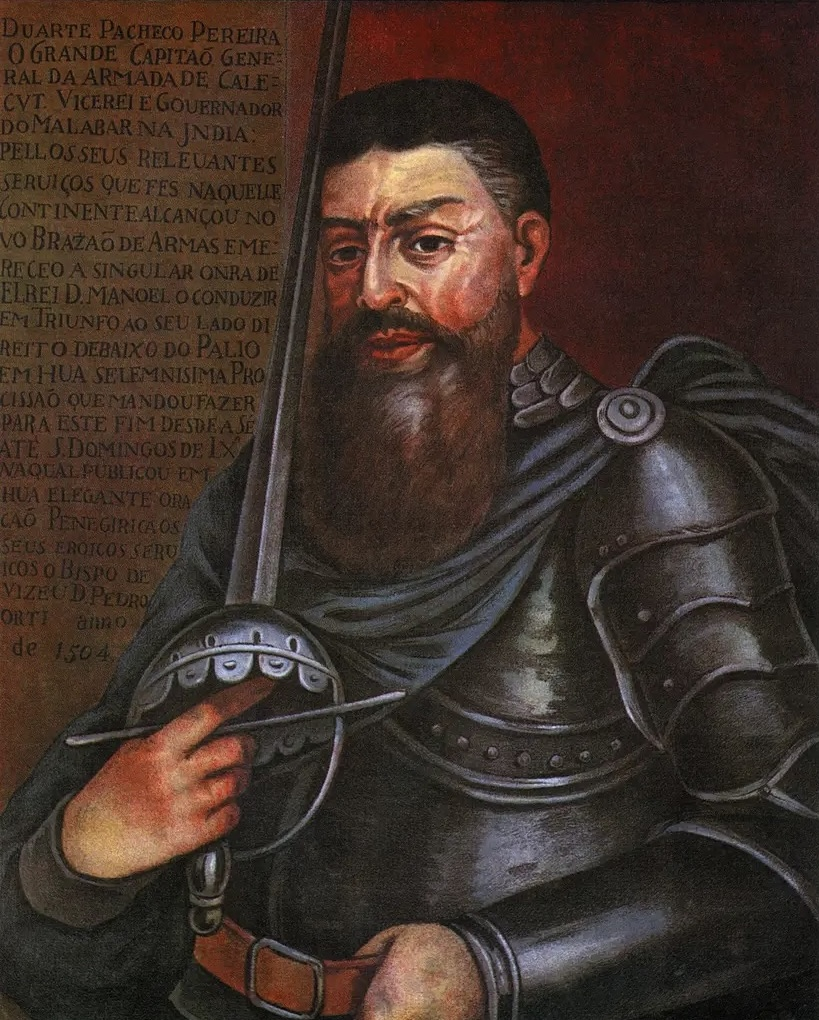

Captain-major of Portuguese Gold Coast
- In office 1519–1522
- Monarch: Manuel I of Portugal
- Preceded by: Fernão Lopes Correia
- Succeeded by: Afonso de Albuquerque

Personal details
- Born: 1460 Lisbon, Kingdom of Portugal
- Died: 1533 (aged 72–73) Kingdom of Portugal
- Spouse: Antónia de Albuquerque
- Children: João Fernandes Pacheco; Jerónimo Pacheco; Maria de Albuquerque; Isabel de Albuquerque; Garcia Pacheco; Gaspar Pacheco; Duarte Pacheco; Lisuarte Pacheco

Military service
- Allegiance: Portuguese Empire
- Battles/wars: Battle of Cochin

Duarte Pacheco Pereira (Portuguese pronunciation: [duˈaɾtɨ pɐˈʃeku pɨˈɾɐjɾɐ]; c. 1460 – 1533), called the Portuguese Achilles (Aquiles Lusitano) by the poet Camões, was a Portuguese sea captain, soldier, explorer and cartographer. He travelled particularly in the central Atlantic Ocean west of the Cape Verde islands, along the coast of West Africa and to India. His accomplishments in strategic warfare, exploration, mathematics and astronomy were of an exceptional level.

== Background ==
Pacheco Pereira was the son of João Pacheco and Isabel Pereira. In his youth he served as the King of Portugal's personal squire. In the year of 1475, having graduated with honors, he was awarded a study fellowship from the monarch himself. Later on, in 1488 he explored the west coast of Africa. His expedition fell ill with fever and lost their ship. Pacheco Pereira was rescued from the island of Príncipe in the Gulf of Guinea by Bartolomeu Dias when Dias was returning from rounding the Cape of Good Hope for the first time.

The knowledge he collected from Dias expedition as well as his own explorations granted him the post of official geographer of the Portuguese monarch. In 1494 he signed the Pope-sanctioned Treaty of Tordesillas, which shared the non-Christian world between Portugal and Spain.

== Pacheco in India ==
In 1503 Duarte Pacheco Pereira departed for India as captain of Espírito Santo, one of the three ships in the fleet headed by Afonso de Albuquerque. In 1504, he was placed in charge of the defence of Cochin, a Portuguese protectorate in India, from a series of attacks between March and July 1504 by the ruling Zamorin of Calicut. (see Battle of Cochin (1504)). Having only 150 Portuguese and a small number of Malabarese auxiliaries at his disposal, Cochin was vastly outnumbered by the Zamorin's army of 60,000. Nonetheless, by clever positioning, individual heroics and a lot of luck, Duarte Pacheco successfully resisted attacks for five months, until the humiliated Zamorin finally called off his forces. His son Lisuarte (or Jusarte) took a leading part in the fight.

For his exploits in the defense of Cochin, Duarte Pacheco was given a grant of arms by the Trimumpara Raja of Cochin, and greeted with honors by King Manuel I of Portugal and public festivities upon his return to Lisbon in 1505.

== After India ==
His diary (1506), preserved in the Portuguese National Archive (Torre do Tombo), is probably the first European document to acknowledge that chimpanzees built their own rudimentary tools.

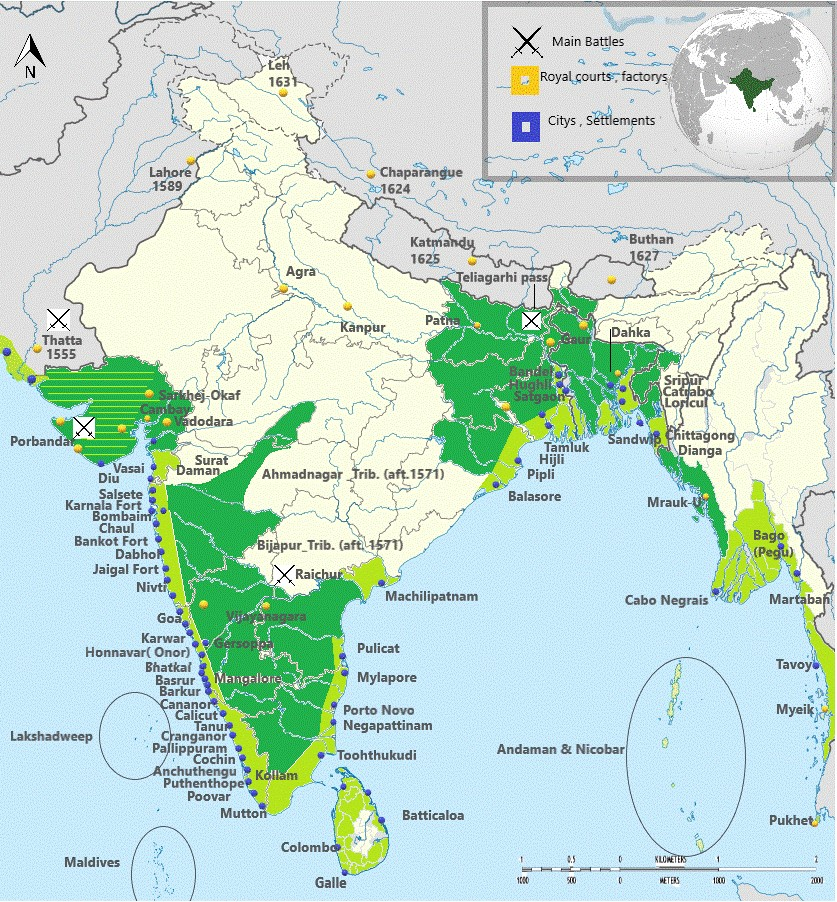
Portuguese presence in India and Bengal Gulf at max extent (16th and 17th centuries)

Between 1505 and 1508 Duarte Pacheco Pereira composed a book, Esmeraldo de Situ Orbis, inspired on Pomponius Mela's De situ Orbis, which has been described as one of the first major scientific works "reporting on what was observed and experimented in the newly 'discovered' environment." Never completed, it was not published until 1892, possibly to avoid giving others information about Portugal's valuable Guinea trade.

(The meaning of the 'esmeraldo' in the title has been much speculated. Among the proposals, it is a reference to the emerald green of the sea; that it is an anagram combining the names 'Emmanuel' (for King Manuel I of Portugal) and 'Eduardus' (of Duarte Pacheco), that Esmeralda might have been the name (or nickname) of the ship Duarte Pacheco sailed to India, that it is a corruption of the Spanish word esmerado (meaning "guide"), that in Malayalam, an emerald gemstone is known as pache or pachec, and thus Esmeraldo is a pun on his own name (thus, "Pacheco's De Situ Orbis").

Duarte Pacheco Pereira was probably one of the first early modern Europeans to scientifically study the relationship between the tides and the phases of the moon, which played a critical importance in the course of the Battle of Cochin, and carefully took notes on the timing of the tides. Pacheco is said to have been the first to notice their connection to the moon and to establish rules for predicting the progress of tides by reference to lunar observations. He also sifted through his data to correct and improve astronomical observations (notably correcting the average daily deviation of the moon from the sun) and constructing nautical measurements to be used by future Portuguese navigators.

In 1508, Duarte Pacheco was commissioned by the Portuguese king to give chase to Mondragon, a French privateer who operated between the Azores and the Portuguese coast, where he attacked the ships coming from Portuguese India. Duarte Pacheco located and cornered Mondragon off Cape Finisterre in 1509, and defeated and captured him.

Later in life, while away governing São Jorge da Mina, he was slandered by his enemies at court with accusations of theft and corruption. He was recalled to the capital and briefly imprisoned until he was exonerated by the Crown being proved innocent. But the damage was done as he had lost his governorship. Although he was acquitted his protector, King João II of Portugal had died and been replaced by a king who didn't acknowledge the value of Duarte Pacheco. Duarte Pacheco had served the previous king as a squire, and had served King Manuel merely as a high ranking servant. His distance from Lisbon and his success meant he had many enemies abroad, and few friends in the capital to defend him. He lived off a pension from the King until his death.

According to one of its most important biographers, the Portuguese historian Joaquim Barradas de Carvalho, who lived in exile in Brazil in the 1960s, Duarte Pacheco was a genius comparable to Leonardo da Vinci. With the anticipation of more than two centuries, the cosmographer was responsible for calculating the value of the degree of the meridian arc with a margin of error of only 4%, when the current error at the time varied between 7 and 15%.

== Possible discovery of Brazil ==
It has also been suggested that Duarte Pacheco Pereira may have discovered the coasts of Maranhão, Pará and Marajó island and the mouth of the Amazon River in 1498, preceding the possible landings of the expeditions of Amerigo Vespucci in 1499, of Vicente Yáñez Pinzon in January 1500, and of Diego de Lepe in February 1500; and the Cabral's expedition in April 1500, making him the first known European explorer of present-day Brazil. This claim is based on interpretations of the cipher manuscript Esmeraldo de Situ Orbis, written by Duarte Pacheco Pereira, which gives the following brief account:

Most fortunate Prince, we have known and seen how in the third year of your reign in the year of Our Lord 1498, in which your Highness ordered us to discover the Western region, a very large landmass with many large islands adjacent, extending 70° North of the Equator, and located beyond the greatness of the Ocean, has been discovered and navigated; this distant land is densely populated and extends 28° degrees on the other side of the Equator towards the Antarctic Pole. Such is its greatness and length that on either side its end has not been seen or known, so that it is certain that it goes round the whole globe.

Pereira drew a map of the world setting out this concept and referred to in chapter 5 of the Esmeraldo, but it has since been lost. He said: “for the better understanding of our work, we have set here a painted map of the world, with the shape and description of these lands”. The 1519 world map by Lopo Homem set out this concept, showing the OCEANUS MERIDIONALIS and INDICUM MARE (Atlantic and Indian Oceans) enclosed by the continental Earth. The world map compiled in 1513 from Portuguese sources by the Ottoman admiral and cartographer Piri Reis is a map of this type, apparently derived from Pereira's.

In their book Foundations of the Portuguese empire, 1415-1580, historians Bailey Wallys, Boyd Shafer and George Winius, based in the Portuguese historian Duarte Leite and other authors, make the following comment:

"What really is important," Duarte Leite says, "is to know whether Pacheco arrived in Brazil before Alvares Cabral (April 22, 1500). In agreement with Luciano Pereira, such modern Portuguese historians as Faustino da Fonseca, Brito Rebelo, Lopes de Mendonça, and Jaime Cortesão say he did. . . as does Vignaud; and I believe he does not lack supporters in Brazil." "However," says Leite, "if Pacheco did discover areas east of the Line of Demarcation and did bring back news of this to [King] Manuel [of Portugal], the reason which induced Don Manuel to keep secret. . . such an important discovery escapes me. As soon as Cabral returned in 1501, Manuel announced the discovery of Brazil to Ferdinand and Isabella of Spain. Why would he not in 1499, after the return of Vasco da Gama, make a similar announcement if Pacheco had already discovered Brazil? No objection could come on the part of Spain, given the division made by the Treaty of Tordesillas, as indeed none came in 1501 when Cabral's discovery was announced. I am persuaded that Pacheco neither discovered Brazil in 1498 nor was present two years later at its discovery by Cabral."

Duarte Pacheco Pereira's Esmeraldo de Situ Orbis is the first European navigation script book to mention the coast of Brazil.

== Marriage and descendants ==
He married Antónia de Albuquerque, daughter of Jorge Garcês and wife Isabel de Albuquerque Galvão, only daughter of Duarte Galvão by first wife Catarina de Sousa e Albuquerque, and had eight children:

- João Fernandes Pacheco, who married Dona Maria da Silva, without issue and had a bastard daughter married with issue
- Jerónimo Pacheco, who died unmarried and without issue in Tangier
- Maria de Albuquerque, married to João da Silva, Alcaide-Mór of Soure, and had a daughter married and with issue
- Isabel de Albuquerque
- Garcia Pacheco
- Gaspar Pacheco
- Duarte Pacheco
- Lisuarte Pacheco, a bastard son according to records.

== See also ==
- First Luso-Malabarese War
  - Battle of Cochin (1504)
- 5th Portuguese India Armada (Albuquerque, 1503)
- Controversies about the discovery of Brazil
