= Lopo Soares de Albergaria =

Third Governor of Portuguese India

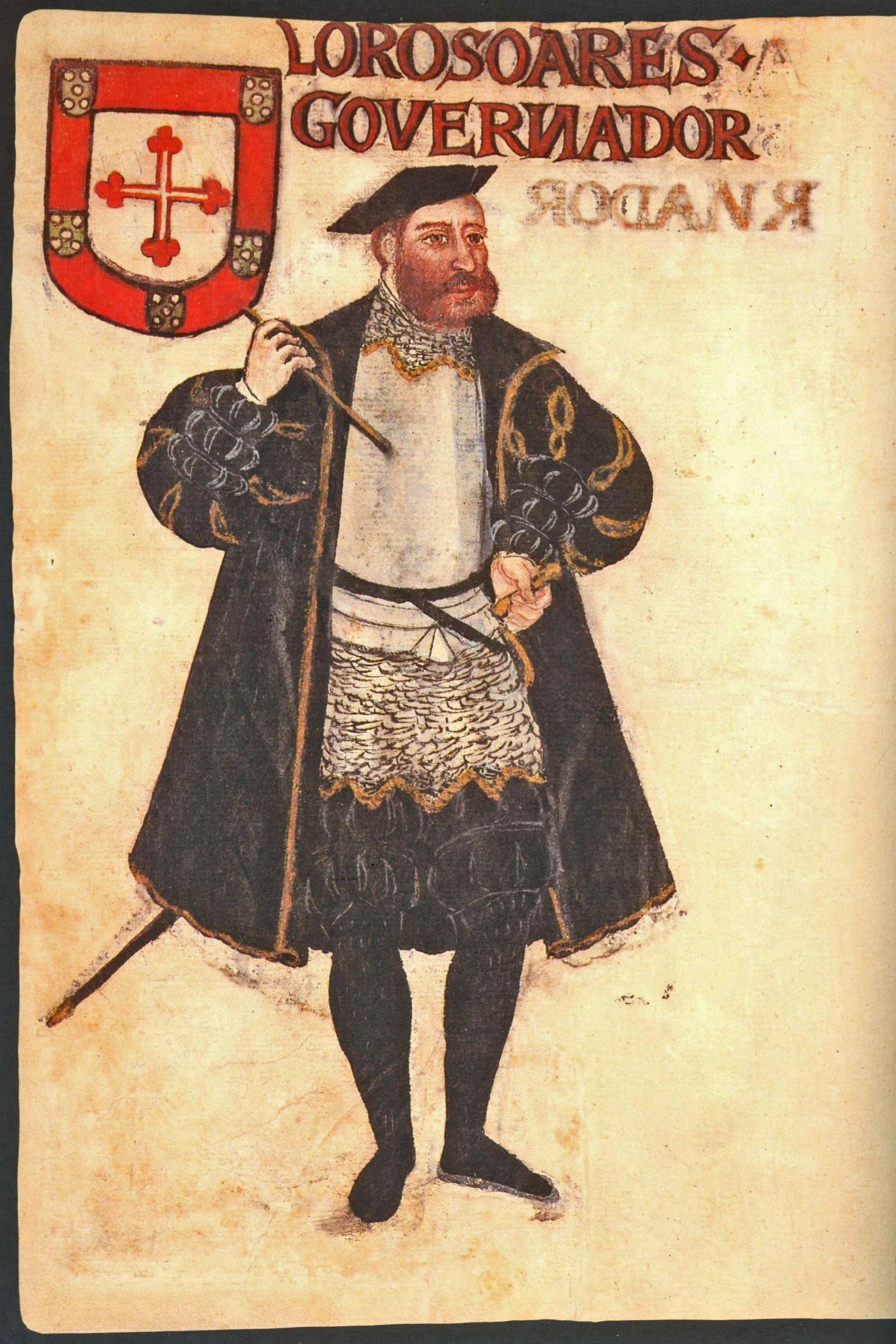
- Portrait in Livro de Lisuarte de Abreu, c. 1560

Captain-major of Gold Coast
- In office 1495–1499
- Monarchs: John II; Manuel I
- Preceded by: João Fogaça
- Succeeded by: Nuno Vaz de Castelo Branco

Governor of India
- In office 1515–1518
- Monarch: Manuel I
- Preceded by: Afonso de Albuquerque
- Succeeded by: Diogo Lopes de Sequeira

Personal details
- Born: c. 1460 Lisbon, Kingdom of Portugal
- Died: 1520 (aged 59–60) Torres Vedras, Kingdom of Portugal
- Spouse: Ana de Albuquerque
- Children: Guiomar de Albuquerque; Catarina de Albuquerque

Military service
- Allegiance: Portuguese Empire
- Commands: 6th Portuguese India Armada
- Battles/wars: Ottoman–Portuguese conflicts

Lopo Soares de Albergaria (c. 1460 – c. 1520) was the fifth captain-major of the Portuguese Gold Coast and third governor of Portuguese India, having reached India in 1515 to succeed Afonso de Albuquerque as governor.

== Career ==
Lopo Soares de Albergaria (sometimes called Lopo Soares de Alvarenga, or simply Lopo Soares) was a middling noble, well-connected to the powerful Almeida family. Lopo Soares had served a successful term (1495–99) as captain-general of São Jorge da Mina in the Portuguese Gold Coast (West Africa).

In 1504 Lopo Soares commanded the 6th Portuguese India Armada. Regarded as one of the more successful early India armadas, Lopo Soares brought the fleet back in 1505 nearly intact, with one of the best cargos yet received by King Manuel I of Portugal. This placed him in a good position for future preferment and appointments.

In March 1515 Lopo Soares de Albergaria was chosen by King Manuel I to succeed Afonso de Albuquerque as governor of Portuguese India, and departed from Lisbon to India on 7 April. The seventeen-ship fleet transported also an embassy to the emperor of Ethiopia with Portuguese ambassador Duarte Galvão, Ethiopian ambassador Mateus (also known as Matthew the Armenian) and father Francisco Álvares. In August, having learned through contacts in Venice that the Mamluk Sultan of Cairo had prepared a fleet at Suez to fight the Portuguese, king Manuel repented to have replaced Albuquerque, and immediately wrote to Albergaria to return the command of all operations to Albuquerque, and provide him with resources to fight. However, when the letter arrived, Albuquerque had already died.

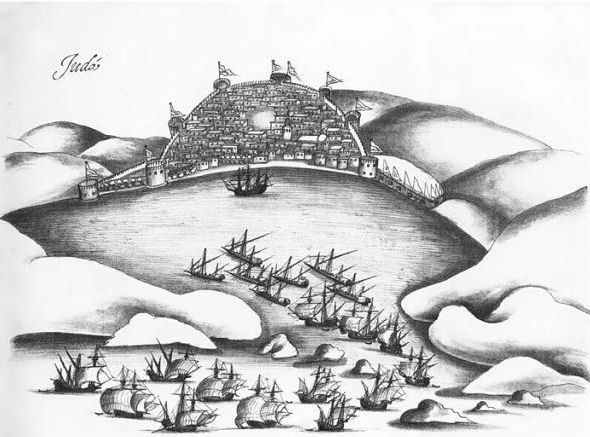
The Ottoman admiral Selman Reis defended Jeddah against the Portuguese attack in 1517.

As governor in India Albergaria made a naval expedition into the Red Sea in 1517, taking on board the embassy to Emperor Dawit II of Ethiopia, including Mateus, Duarte Galvão and Francisco Álvares, with the intent of landing them on the coast. First Albergaria reached Aden, which offered to surrender but he felt he could not spare the men to garrison the port. Albergaria failed to capture Jeddah in 1517, and the attempt to land the embassy by reaching the port of Massawa failed as well, with Albergaria getting no closer than the Dahlak Archipelago, and was aborted after the death of old Duarte Galvão at Kamaran. Álvares and Mateus were forced to wait until Albergaria's replacement, Diogo Lopes de Sequeira, successfully sent the embassy under D. Rodrigo de Lima in 1520.

In 1518 Lopo Soares de Albergaria captured Ceylon for his king, having landed at Colombo with a large fleet. Here he ordered the construction of a small fort named "Nossa Senhora das Virtudes" or "Santa Bárbara".

== References in culture ==
Lope Soarez, a character in Jan Potocki’s “The Manuscript Found in Saragossa”, has been speculated to have been based on Lopo Soares de Albergaria.

== See also ==
- First Luso-Malabarese War
- Portuguese India Armadas

Preceded by João Fogaça	Captain-major of Portuguese Gold Coast; 1495–1499	Succeeded by Nuno Vaz de Castelo Branco

Preceded by Afonso de Albuquerque	Governor of Portuguese India; 1515–1518	Succeeded by Diogo Lopes de Sequeira
