= Gaspar Correia =

Portuguese historian (1492 – c. 1563)

- Born: 1492; Portugal
- Died: c. 1563; Goa, Portuguese India
- Occupation: Historian

Gaspar Correia (1492 – c. 1563, in Goa) was a Portuguese historian best known for Lendas da Índia (Legends of India), one of the earliest and most significant works on Portuguese rule in Asia.

== Biography ==
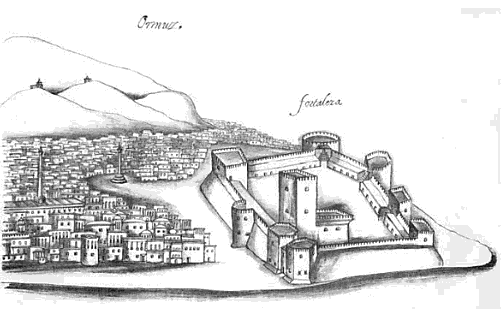
Hormuz Fortress from the Lendas da Índia (c.1550)

Little is known about Gasper Correia's personal life including his family origins and birthplace. It is generally assumed that he was born in 1492. He spent most of his life in Portuguese India, reportedly arriving around 1512-14 to serve as a soldier and then chosen as scrivener to Afonso de Albuquerque—a role he held with great pride. He returned to Portugal in 1529 for some time but later returned to India. His major work Lendas da Índia, though written in a rough style, is considered an indispensable contemporary reference, having profited from his thirty-five years' work in India, and from privileged sources unknown to Fernão Lopes de Castanheda or João de Barros. He wrote the first European account on Asiatic Cholera. One theory suggests that he was murdered in Portuguese Malacca, by order of Governor Estêvão da Gama, the son of Vasco da Gama.

The 3,500-page Lendas da Índia manuscript was brought from India to Portugal by Miguel da Gama shortly after Correia's death and copies were circulated only among authorised persons. One author claims, without citing a source, that the manuscript was published in 12 volumes in 1556, though no copies have ever been found. His family retained the manuscript of the original, which was printed in 1858 (first part) and 1864 (second part) by the Royal Academy of Sciences of Lisbon.

He died around 1563 in Goa, Portuguese India.

== Bibliography ==
- CORREIA, Gaspar. Lendas da Índia (introduction and review by M. Lopes de Almeida). Porto: 1975.
- BELL, Aubrey Fitz Gerald, "Gaspar Corrêa", Hispanic notes & monographs; essays, studies, and brief biographies issued by the Hispanic Society of America. Portuguese series v, Volume 5 of Hispanic society of America, Oxford University Press, H. Milford, 1924.
- BANHA de ANDRADE, António Alberto, Gaspar Correia, o 1.º historiador português do Oriente. (Gaspar Correia, the First Portuguese Historian of the Far East) Instituto de Investigação Científica Tropical, Centro de Estudos de História e Cartografia Antiga, Lisbon, 1985.
