= Frederic Charles Danvers =

British civil servant and writer on engineering (1833–1906)

Frederic Charles Danvers ComC
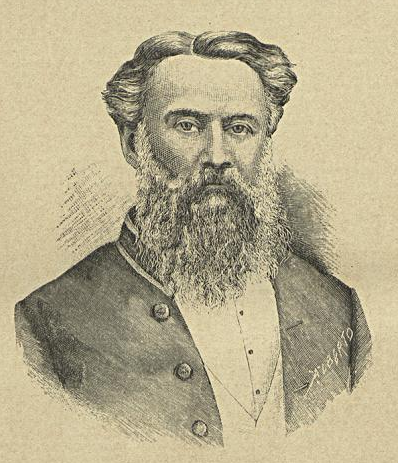
- Engraved portrait by Caetano Alberto da Silva, after a photograph by J. Robinson & Sons
- Born: 1 July 1833; Hornsey, Haringey, London
- Died: 17 May 1906 (aged 72); Broad Oaks, Addlestone, Surrey
- Occupation: Civil servant

Frederic Charles Danvers (1833–1906), often Frederick, was a British civil servant and writer on engineering. The Superintendent of the India Office Records between 1884 and 1898, he was also a historian and wrote works on India.

== Life ==
Born at Hornsey on 1 July 1833, he was second son of Frederick Samuel Danvers of Hornsey, an officer in the East India Company's service, and his wife Mary Matilda Middleton, daughter of H. Middleton of Wanstead, Essex. After education at the Merchant Taylors' School, London, King's College, London, and Addiscombe College, he studied for two years as a civil and mechanical engineer. Then he became, on 26 January 1853, a writer in the old East India House.

On the creation of the India Office Danvers was, in September 1858, made a junior clerk there. Deputed in 1859 to Liverpool and Manchester to report on the fitness of traction engines for use in India, where railway construction was still in its infancy, he was transferred on account of his technical knowledge to the public works department of the India Office in 1861. He there rose to be senior clerk in June 1867, and assistant secretary in February 1875. He attended the Exposition Universelle of 1867 in Paris, reporting in the Quarterly Journal of Science that other European nations were closing the technology gap with the United Kingdom.

Plans by Danvers for a tunnel under the Hugli River to continue the East India railway into Calcutta were forwarded by Sir Stafford Northcote to India in 1868. In 1877 he was transferred as assistant secretary to the revenue department of the India Office, and was in January 1884 made registrar and superintendent of records. He undertook sorting and binding of records. A start was made on their publication, with lists, calendars and catalogues also produced. Work on the archive continued into the 1930s, but the scale was large, and projects, even though selective, were left incomplete. Another scholarly effort began in the 1960s.

Danvers was sent to Lisbon in 1891 to study records of Portuguese rule in the East. His report, based on research in the Torre do Tombo archives and the public libraries in Lisbon and Evora, was published in 1892. He retired from the India Office in July 1898. His work on Portuguese records and history was recognised with the Order of Christ, knight commander. Archival researches 1893–5 at The Hague into Dutch maritime history were the subject of a further report, published in 1945 as Dutch activities in the east.

Danvers died on 17 May 1906 at Broad Oaks, Addlestone, Surrey, and was buried at All Saints' Church, Benhilton.

== Works ==
Danvers published History of the Portuguese in India (2 vols. 1894), an ambitious work. Sydney Ernest Fryer wrote in the Dictionary of National Biography that it "was marred by want of perspective and incomplete reference to authorities.

Outside his official duties, Danvers wrote mainly on technical areas. He contributed articles on public works in India to Engineering (1866–75), and a volume "India" (1877) in the series Information for Colonial Engineers published by E. and F. N. Spon. He besides compiled memoranda on Indian coal, coal washing, and artificial fuel (1867–9), and publishing Statistical Papers relating to India (parliamentary paper, 1869), Coal Economy (1872), and A Century of Famines, 1770–1870 (1877). He read papers before the Society of Arts on Agriculture in India (1878), Famines in India (1886), and The India Office Records (1889). The first and third of these papers gained the Society's silver medal. He was elected a fellow of the Royal Statistical Society in 1880, subsequently served on its council, and read papers before it on Agriculture in Essex (1897) and A Review of Indian Statistics (1901). He was elected a member of the Society of Arts in 1890.

Danvers also wrote:

- Bengal, its Chiefs, Agents and Governors, 1888.
- The Second Borgian Map, 1889.

He edited Memorials of Old Haileybury College (1894), and wrote introductions to Letters received by the East India Company from its Servants in the East (1896); List of Factory Records of the late East India Company (1897); and List of Marine Records of the late East India Company (1897). The Covenant; or, Jacob's Heritage (1877) and Israel Redivivus, 1905, an endeavour to identify the Ten Tribes with the English people, belong to the literature of British Israelism. The latter is mentioned in the Encyclopædia of Religion and Ethics article "Anglo-Israelis".

== Family ==
Danvers married in 1860, at Hove, Louisa (b. 2 November 1837), daughter of Elias Mocatta. She died at Sutton, Surrey, on 29 May 1909, and was buried beside her husband. They had three sons and five daughters. Lilian, the youngest daughter, married in 1901 Charles William Danvers-Walker and was mother of Bob Danvers-Walker. The eldest son, Alan, was also honoured by Carlos I of Portugal in 1893, as Baron Danvers, Knight (Cavaleiro) of the Order of Christ; he was a telephone engineer, manager in Lisbon of the Edison Gower-Bell Telephone Company of Europe, Ltd. He was born in 1861, and married in 1885 Alice Isabel Bowerbank.
