= Fernão Lopes de Castanheda =

Portuguese historian

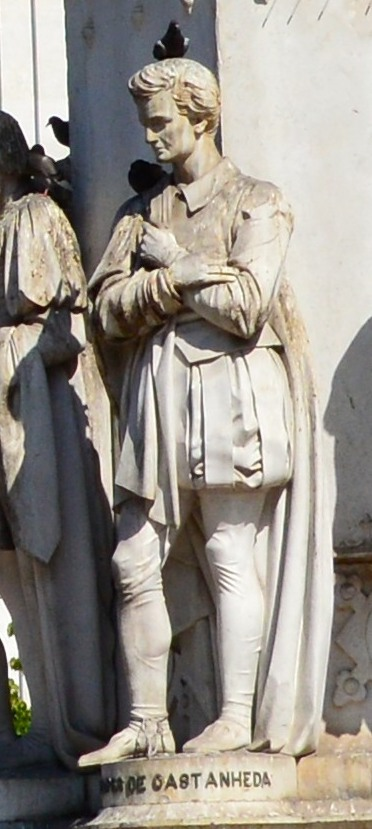
- Fernão Lopes de Castanheda in the Camões Monument
- Born: c.1500 Santarém, Portugal
- Died: 6 June 1559 (aged 59); Coimbra, Portugal
- Occupations: Author, bedel and archivist at University of Coimbra
- Writing career
- Period: Renaissance
- Genres: Literature of discovery and conquest
- Subject: History of Portuguese exploration
- Notable works: História do descobrimento e conquista da India pelos portugueses/History of the Discovery and Conquest of India by the Portuguese

Fernão Lopes de Castanheda (Santarém, c. 1500 – 1559 in Coimbra) was a Portuguese historian in the early Renaissance. His "History of the discovery and conquest of India", full of geographic and ethnographic objective information, was widely translated throughout Europe.

== Life ==
Castanheda was the natural son of a royal officer, who held the post of judge in Goa. In 1528, he accompanied his father to Portuguese India and to the Moluccas. There he remained ten years, from 1528 to 1538, during which he gathered as much information as he could about the discovery and conquest of India by the Portuguese, in order to write a book on the subject. In 1538, he returned to Portugal, having collected from written and oral sources material for his great historical work. In serious economic difficulties, he settled in Coimbra, where he held a modest post of bedel in the University of Coimbra.

== Works ==
Eight of the ten books of Castanheda's "História do descobrimento e conquista da Índia pelos portugueses" (History of the discovery and conquest of India by the Portuguese) were printed in Coimbra: the first volume was issued in 1551, with a second edition in 1554. Six more volumes were published in his lifetime and three posthumously. After the eighth volume was issued, regent Queen D. Catarina, pressured by few noblemen who disliked the objectivity of Castanheda, banned the printing of the remaining ninth and tenth volumes. His work, full of geographic and ethnographic information, was soon widely translated throughout Europe, first into French by Nicolas de Grouchy, a teacher at the University, Spanish (1554), Italian (1578) and English (1582).
