= Battle of Cochin =

1504 battle

- Part of the First Luso-Malabarese War
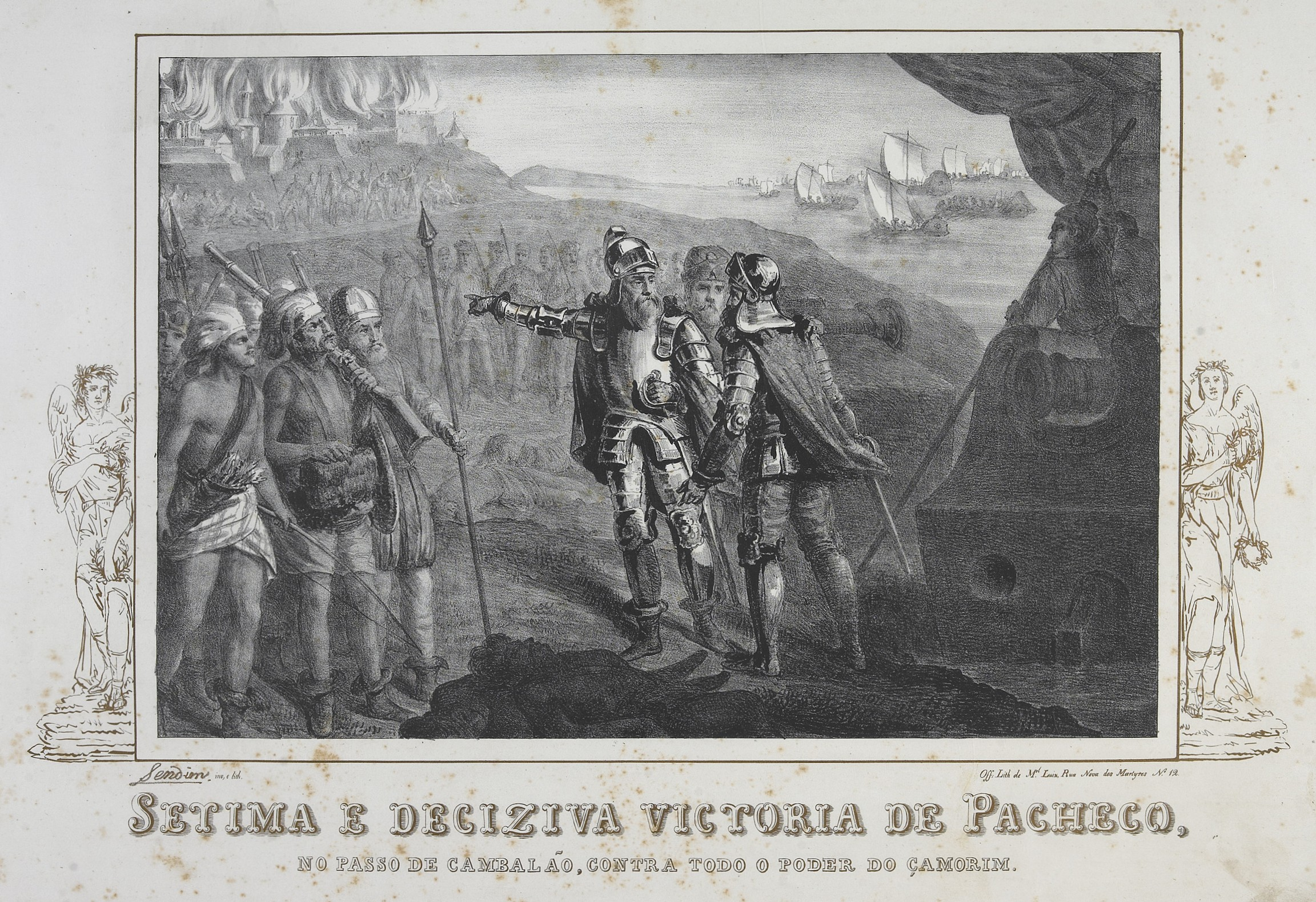
- Duarte Pacheco's victory at the Battle of Cochin, Portuguese lithograph from 1840
| Date | 16 March – 3 July 1504 |
| Location | Kochi, India |
| Result | Kochi-Portuguese victory |

Belligerents
| Portuguese Empire; Kingdom of Cochin | Calicut; Vassal Malabari states: Edapalli; Cranganore; Kottakkal; Kingdom of Tanur; Beypore; Chaliyam; Pariyapuram etc. |

Commanders and leaders
| Duarte Pacheco Pereira; Candagora, heir of Cochin; Trimumpara Raja | Zamorin Raja of Calicut; Naubeadarim, heir of Calicut; Elancol, Kaimal of Edapalli |

The Battle of Cochin, sometimes referred as the second siege of Cochin, was a series of confrontations, between March and July 1504, fought on land and sea, principally between the Portuguese garrison at Cochin, allied to the Trimumpara Raja, and the armies of the Zamorin of Calicut and vassal Malabari states.

The celebrated heroics of the tiny Portuguese garrison, led by Duarte Pacheco Pereira, fended off an invading army several hundred times bigger. It proved a humiliating defeat for the Zamorin of Calicut. He not only failed to conquer Cochin, but his inability to crush the tiny opposition undermined the faith of his vassals and allies. The Zamorin lost much of his traditional authority over the Malabar states of India in the aftermath. The preservation of Cochin secured the continued presence of the Portuguese in India.

== Background ==
Since the fragmentation of the Chera state in the 10th century, the ruler of the city-state of Calicut (Port. Calecute; now, Kozhikode), known as the Zamorin (Samoothiri Raja, 'Lord of the Sea') had been generally recognized as overlord by most of the small states on the Malabar Coast of India. Under the Zamorin's rule, Calicut grew as a commercial city, emerging as the major entrepot of the Kerala pepper trade and the principal emporium for other spices shipped from further east (see spice trade).

In the opening journey of the Portuguese to India in 1498, Vasco da Gama immediately made his way to Calicut and tried to secure a commercial treaty with the Zamorin. Unimpressed by Gama, the elderly Zamorin allowed the Portuguese to buy spices on Calicut's markets, but refused to accord them any greater privileges.

The follow-up expedition of Pedro Álvares Cabral (2nd India Armada, 1500) arrived better prepared. The old Zamorin having died in the interim, Cabral negotiated a treaty with the new Zamorin, and a Portuguese factory was opened in Calicut. But within a couple of months, quarrels erupted between Portuguese agents and established Arab traders in the city, in which the Zamorin refused to intervene. In December 1500, a riot was raised and the factory in Calicut was overrun and numerous Portuguese massacred. Blaming the Zamorin for the incident, Cabral demanded that the Zamorin compensate them for their losses and expel all Arab traders from the city. When the Zamorin refused, Cabral bombarded the city of Calicut.

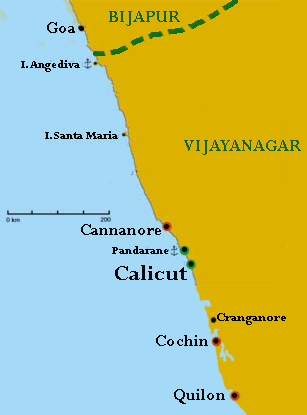
India Malabar Coast c. 1500

Thus began the war between Portugal and Calicut. The Portuguese quickly found local allies among some of the city-states on the Malabar coast which had long grated under Calicut's dominance. Cochin (Cochim, Kochi), Cannanore (Canonor, Kannur) and Quilon (Coulão, Kollam) opened their ports and invited the Portuguese.

The succeeding Portuguese armadas to India took to routinely bombarding Calicut, preying on her ships, and driving commercial traffic away from the city. The Zamorin quickly learned that there was little point challenging the Portuguese fleets at sea – the technological gap in ships and cannon was just too great – but on land the difference was not nearly as lopsided. The Portuguese presence in India consisted only of a handful of commercial agents, after all.

The Portuguese had come for spices. The Zamorin calculated that if he could exert his traditional authority over the Malabar states and close off access to spices, the Portuguese would either leave or be forced to negotiate terms and make a sensible peace. That meant trying to force his enemy kingdoms of Cochin, Cannanore and Quilon into shutting their markets to the Portuguese.

In principle, the Zamorin's plan was sound. The Portuguese had antagonised some of the residents of the Malabar coast. Their fleets had left a brutish calling card, made absurd demands upon the rulers, disrupted trade and daily life all along the coast. It should not have been too difficult to prevail upon the Malabari cities to participate in a general boycott of Portuguese trade, at least temporarily. But the Cochin rejected Zamorin's unreasonable demands.

=== First siege of Cochin (1503) ===
The city of Cochin (Cochim, Kochi) was a growing commercial town perched on the edge of the Vembanad lagoon. The ruling Hindu prince, Unni Goda Varma, the Trimumpara Raja of Cochin, was not secure in his own position. Formally, he was a minor prince, subsidiary to senior family members across the lagoon at Edapalli (Repelim), the official overlords of the lagoon. Indeed, it is quite probable Trimumpara was in the midst of a family quarrel and originally sought out the Portuguese alliance to strengthen his own position against his relatives.

Sentiment among the Cochinese population was largely against the Portuguese. Cochin was not self-sufficient in food, and the people had suffered much from the general disruption of trade along the Malabar coast. Moreover, Cochin had a significant Muslim population – both expatriate Arabs and local Mappilas – and the Portuguese had made no secret of their hostility towards them. Yet these were usually the very traders upon whom the city's subsistence depended. The Cochinese population did not, could not, see the point of the current state of affairs.

Sensing the resentment, Trimumpara Raja had the Portuguese factor Diogo Fernandes Correia and his assistants, Lourenço Moreno and Álvaro Vaz, stay at his own palace, and ensured they were always escorted by loyal guards when walking around the city's markets. But the Zamorin's influence over the Kerala hinterlands had dried up much of Cochin's pepper supply. The Portuguese factors were disappointed at the spare findings on Cochin's spice markets, and the Trimumpara Raja was painfully aware of their increasing interest in other more promising cities, notably Quilon. If the Portuguese abandoned Cochin, the Trimumpara would have nothing to show for his pains.

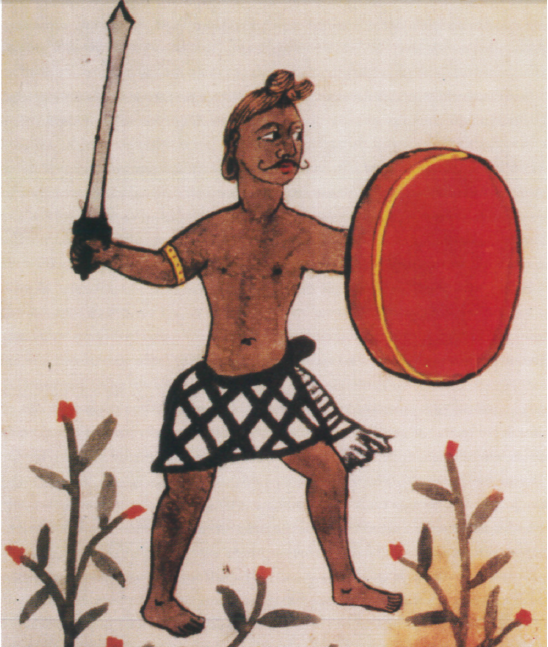
16th century Portuguese depiction of a Malabarese Nair warrior

The Trimumpara's advisors argued against the Portuguese alliance, and urged him to pursue a reconciliation with the Zamorin. They warned him that the continued loyalty of the Cochinese Nairs could not be taken for granted in the event of a war. Nonetheless, the Trimumpara Raja refused to abandon the Portuguese.

In March, 1503, as soon as the Portuguese fleet (4th Armada) had set sail back to Lisbon, the Zamorin decided to intimidate his enemy into compliance. The Portuguese had left a small coastal patrol behind, to help defend Cochin. But the patrol's commander, Vicente Sodré dismissed the rumors of the Zamorin's military preparations and decided to take his patrol to cruise the mouth of the Red Sea. They did not return until the end of the summer.

In April, the Zamorin led a large Calicut army of some 50,000 troops against Cochin. Along the way, he was to be joined by allied Malabari lords, notably the rulers of Edapalli. The Trimumpara's son Narayan rushed with a force of 5,500 Cochinese troops to block the passage of the Calicut army over a ford near Edapalli (Repelim). Narayan valiantly repelled two Calicut assaults, but eventually the Zamorin's agents, by bribery and subterfuge, managed to detach many of the Cochinese Nairs from the frontline. In the next assault, Narayan was overwhelmed and killed, along with his remaining forces.

Narayan's brave stand gave his father and his Portuguese guests enough time to flee Cochin across the water to Vypin island (Vaipim) with a small core of loyal guards. The Zamorin seized Cochin city and demanded Trimumpara hand over the Portuguese agents, but the king refused. Vypin's natural defenses and the worsening weather prevented the launching of an assault against the island. The frustrated Zamorin limited himself to burning the city of Cochin and vowed to return after the weather improved.

Before burning down Cochin, the Zamorin of Calicut removed an ancient sacred stone, upon which the old Chera Kings of Malabar were traditionally ceremonially esconsed as lords of the sea and overlords of all the Malabari states. The sacred stone had originally been housed at the ancient Malabari capital of Cranganore, but had since been moved to Cochin. The Zamorin now moved it once more, to Edapalli.

The main Calicut army returned that same August, and once again Trimumpara Raja and the Portuguese agents were holed up in Vypin. The Zamorin and his Malabari allies were in the process of preparing assault boats against the island, when they spotted six armed Portuguese ships under Francisco de Albuquerque – the vanguard of the arriving 5th Armada – racing towards Cochin. The allied Malabari armies began to melt away immediately. The Zamorin reluctantly dismantled the siege and returned to Calicut.

=== Preparations ===
Cochin had been saved in the nick of time, but the Zamorin's armies were sure to return next Spring, as soon as the 5th Armada left. So the Portuguese immediately set about making preparations for Cochin's defense in the fleet's absence.

In the first order of business, a squadron of Portuguese ships did a tour of the Vembanad lagoon, punishing the local princelets who had given their support to the Zamorin's siege. Notable in this campaign was the Portuguese brutal sack of Edapalli, razing the city, with great bloodshed. Smaller towns and villages either met a similar fate, or quickly switched their allegiance over to Cochin. In this manner, the Trimumpara Raja of Cochin was forcibly imposed by Portuguese arms as the overlord of the Vembanad lagoon.

In the meantime, the Portuguese commanders persuaded Trimumpara Raja to allow them to erect a fortress on the edge of the Cochinese peninsula (an area now known as Fort Kochi), just a little to the west of the old city of Cochin proper (around what is now Mattancherry). Fort Manuel de Cochim, as it was named, was the first Portuguese fort in Asia. Built from local coconut palm timber supplied by the Trimumpara himself, the fort was completed in a couple of months.

As soon at it was finished, the Portuguese fleet commander Afonso de Albuquerque, against all odds, suddenly agreed to a peace treaty with the Zamorin of Calicut. It was probably a cynical move on both sides – no one really expected the peace to hold, but it bought them a little time. For a few weeks, the Portuguese could finish their defenses, the Zamorin could prepare his forces, without being molested by the other. But the peace was soon broken again in a skirmish over the delivery of a spice shipment in Cranganore.

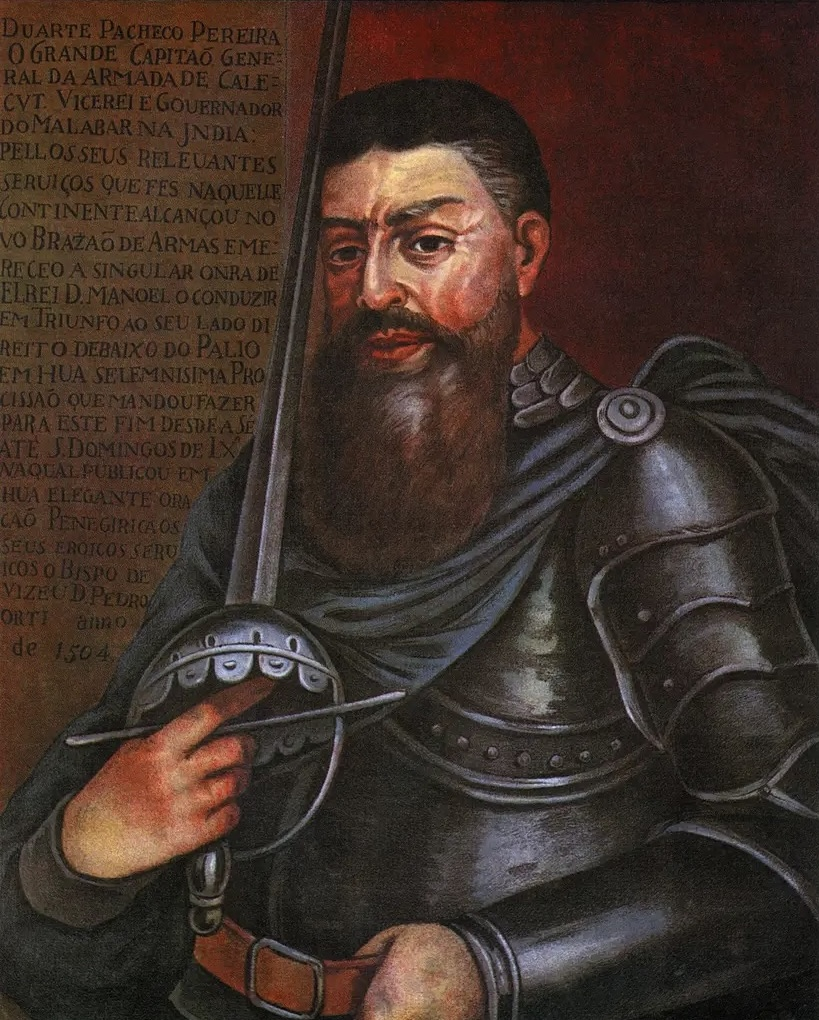
Duarte Pacheco Pereira, first commander of Fort Manuel of Cochin

In late January, 1504, Albuquerque's 5th Armada finally departed Cochin. They left behind a small garrison of around 150 armed Portuguese troops (some say only 130 or less) in Fort Manuel of Cochin, under the command of the knight Duarte Pacheco Pereira. Pacheco was also given three ships – one carrack (the nau Concepção under Diogo Pereira) and two caravels (the Garrida of Pêro Rafael, and another of unknown name under Diogo Pires (or Peres)).

[Note: It is possible that this 'Diogo Pereira' is none other than Diogo Fernandes Pereira the lost captain of the third squadron of the 5th Armada, who had discovered Socotra and wintered there, and set on a solo crossed of the Indian Ocean around this time. If so, then the nau Concepção might be his ship.

Intelligence networks in south India were such that both the Zamorin and the Trimumpara knew each other's every movement (the element of surprise was never really an exploitable tactic on the Malabar coast). And, sure enough, news soon arrived of the assembly of a large invasion army in Calicut. Unlike the previous one, this army was better equipped. The Zamorin had received a large contingent of firearms (arquebuses and/or muskets) from the Turks. Two Venetian agents that had secretly come to India with the 4th Armada had been busy helping Calicut forge better artillery. At least five European large cannons were ready, as well as a couple hundred smaller boat guns. Notices had been sent to the Zamorin's allies – the lords (Kaimals) of Edapalli, Cranganore, Kottakkal, Kingdom of Tanur (Vettath raja of Vettattnad), Beypore, Chaliyam, Pariyapuram etc. – to prepare their auxiliary forces.

News of the size and arms of the Zamorin's alerted Cochin. Cochin had lost a battle during the previous year's siege. Although, in his new position as lord of the Vembanad backwaters, the Trimumpara Raja could, notionally, call on 30,000 troops from around the lagoon, at most 8,000 might respond to his call, the remainder being "actively or passively hostile."

Rumors soon spread through Cochin that the Portuguese garrison had no intention to stay, that ships were being prepared to evacuate the Portuguese to Cannanore or Quilon the moment the Zamorin's army arrived, and leave the Cochinese to bear the brunt of the assault. The population of Cochin began to evacuate the city. Trimumpara Raja himself began to waver, his advisors urging him to seek out a reconciliation with the Zamorin before it was too late.

Duarte Pacheco's first order of business was to stiffen Trimumpara Raja's resolve, persuading him that the Portuguese were there to stay. Remembering how the Portuguese coastal patrol of Vicente Sodré had abandoned them during last year's siege, the Trimumpara had ample reason to doubt Pacheco's word. But he also knew his fate was fatally tied to the Portuguese. Shaking off his misgivings, he placed the defense of the city in their hands. Trimumpara issued edicts forbidding anybody to leave Cochin on the penalty of death, and ordering his own officials and soldiers to treat an order from Duarte Pacheco as if it were his own.

Of particular concern was the Muslim merchant community in Cochin. The Portuguese had made no secret of their hostility and regarded them suspiciously as a 'fifth column' for the Zamorin. But Cochin was dependent upon their trade for their food supply and should the siege be prolonged, the fate of the city would be in their hands. Duarte Pacheco went out of his way to secure their cooperation. He addressed an assembly the leading Muslim merchants of Cochin, promising that no harm would come to them. He co-opted a few of their leaders (notably, a certain Muhammad Marakkar) and, just in case, held some leading Muslim families hostage, shipping them over the outlet under guard to Vypin island for the duration of the hostilities. Large stores of foodstuffs (rice, sugar, etc.) were also stockpiled in Vypin in case the Zamorin's agents set fire to the city or it had to be evacuated.

In prelude, Duarte Pacheco launched a few minor raids on some small settlements around Edapalli, which sided with the Zamorin. Their strategic value was minor – it was more a show of force and bravado, to inculcate confidence in the Cochin population that the Portuguese were itching for a fight. (However, it seems that these raids may have damaged one of the two Portuguese caravels, making it unavailable for the upcoming confrontation).

== Pass of Cambalão ==
From intelligence networks, Duarte Pacheco Pereira received the details of the Zamorin's armed forces and, more importantly, their movements. The Zamorin himself was leading a 57,000 strong army of Calicut (some cite 84,000, which may or may not include auxiliaries; although certainly most of these were very lightly armed, at best.). The Zamorin's army was bringing the five European large guns, cast by the two Venetian engineers, and nearly 300 smaller Indian guns. The army was assembled near Cranganore, and were to march south along the east bank of the Vembanad lagoon, and cross the fording passage by Kumbalam (Cambalão). The ford was said to be a mere 100 m wide, waist-deep, and passable at all tides, so the vast Calicut army would not need to go through the complicated, disorderly process of loading and unloading ferry-boats.

The Calicut fleet was composed of 160 vessels – about 76 of which were paraus (a sail-and-oar-powered Malabari warship, often compared by European writers to a fusta or galiot). Each parau was armed with two bombards, five muskets and 25 archers. The remaining boats were smaller, some 54 catures (a smaller version of the parau) and 30 tones (canoes), each mounted with a cannon, and 16 soldiers. The fleet was under the command of the Zamorin's nephew (and heir of Calicut), Naubea Daring (Naubeadarim), with the lord (Kaimal) Elcanol of Edapalli as second-in-command. The fleet was to slip into the Vembanad lagoon via the outlet near Cranganore and then sail down the lagoon, accompanying and protecting the infantry.

Being fully informed of the Zamorin's plans, Duarte Pacheco Pereira determined that the Portuguese-Cochinese forces needed to block the passage of the army at Kumbalam ford (Passo de Cambalão). That meant distributing his forces carefully. He placed the factor Diogo Fernandes Correia and his two assistants, Lourenço Moreno and Álvaro Vaz, with 39 men at Fort Manuel. The large nau Concepção was loaded with 25 men, artillery and five expert gunners, and placed under the command of Diogo Pereira (possibly Diogo Fernandes Pereira?) and instructed to remain close to the Fort and defend Cochin city (it would simultaneously guard the Vembanad outlet and prevent Calicut ships from slipping through there).

Duarte Pacheco placed 26 men in one of the caravels under the command of Pêro Rafael. The other caravel still under repair, Pacheco commandeered two Malabarese bateis (comparable to pinnaces), placing one (with 23 men) under Diogo Pires, and the other (with 22 men) under himself. Each batel was armed with four swivel guns. These three vessels would try to hold Kumbalam ford.

Cochinese workers had produced a collection of tower shields (paveses), thick wooden planks, two fingers thick, which were mounted all along the sides of the caravel and bateis as makeshift crenellations to protect the crew from missile fire. Rope nets were hung across the masts and sacks filled with cotton were placed throughout the ship's deck, and hung all along the sides, to protect the ships from cannonballs. Boatloads of good hard stone had been shipped down from Anjediva island to be carved by Cochinese workers into cannonballs for the Portuguese guns. Cochinese workers had also been quietly producing a large number of 3.5-metre-tall (11-foot) poles, sharpened at one end, hardened by fire on the other, with pre-cut grooves to allow them to be snapped tight with crosspoles.

The bulk of his army having deserted, Trimumpara Raja of Cochin was left with less than 5,000 troops. He assigned around 500 Nairs to join Duarte Pacheco's little fleet at Kumbalam pass, retaining the remainder to protect the city.

Navigating carefully through the thin brackish narrows and straits of Vembanad lake, Duarte Pacheco's three ships (and accompanying Cochinese boats) arrived at the Kumbalam ford, a mere 100 m of shallow water. Pacheco ordered the long sharpened poles drilled deep mid-channel and across the length of the ford, a makeshift stockade to block the passage of the infantry. He subsequently ordered the ships tied to each other, and to the banks (with iron cords, so that they could not be easily cut and set adrift). The ships were set with the broadsides facing the shores.

=== Location of the pass ===
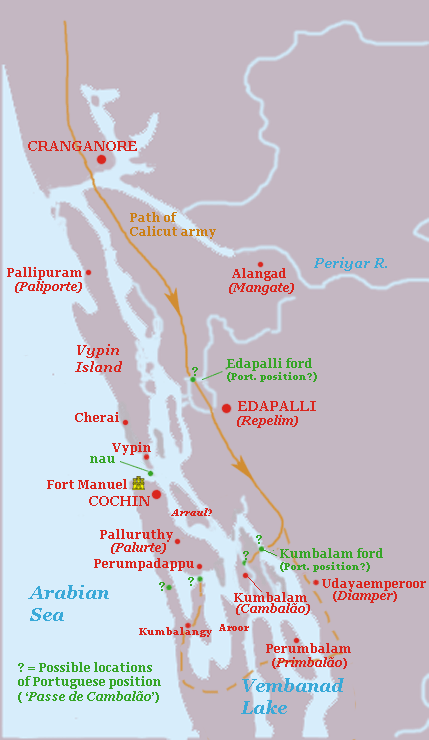
Conjectural map showing several possible positions of the 'Pass of Cambalão' held by the Portuguese in April 1504. Note: this map is highly conjectural, based roughly on the modern geography of Kochi and Vembanad lake, which has probably changed substantially since the 16th century. Green dots = possible locations of the Portuguese position, Straight line = most probable route of Calicut army; Dotted line = alternative longer route for army of Calicut.

The exact location of the Passe de Cambalão, the fording point where Duarte Pacheco Pereira made his stand, is uncertain and disputed in various sources. Portuguese Cambalão is probably modern Kumbalam on the elongated islands in the middle-southern part of the Vembanad lagoon – that is below Cochin city. However, some historians (e.g. Logan (1887), Whiteway (1894), Monteiro (1989)) suggest the Portuguese made their stand much further north, at the ford of Edapalli (Portuguese Repelim), the same pass which Narayan fruitlessly tried to hold the previous year. There are reasons to justify either location and doubt the other.

If Kumbalam was indeed the passage, that would suggest the Zamorin's army marched all down the east coast of the lagoon unchallenged. That is not necessarily unlikely. The passage across Kumbalam islands certainly makes a narrow passage for the troops to ford across to the Cochinese peninsula and march calmly up behind Cochin city. The problem is that it also means that the Zamorin's fleet sailed the entire length of the lagoon, from the environs of Cranganore down to Kumbalam – that is, their fleet sailed past Cochin without making a lunge at it or being challenged. And that is unlikely, especially as the Portuguese kept their nau on guard before the city. As a result, the alternative theory, that the Portuguese held their position at Edapalli ford makes more sense. The name was simply misunderstood – they were blocking the road to Kumbalam, not at Kumbalam.

But Edapalli pass brings up other inconsistencies – in particular, later in the campaign, the Zamorin sent part of his army to try a different pass to Palurte, which is almost certainly Palluruthy, again south of Cochin. If they were encamped by Kumbalam, it makes perfect sense – the Zamorin just needed to go back a few steps. But if they were held up at Edapalli ford, that detachment would have had to go across the very pass the Portuguese were holding. If they circumvented it, they would come up below them, which then brings up the question why not attack the Portuguese pass from both sides and finish off the story there? It is possible that Palurte is misidentified, that it is not Pallurthy, but somewhere else (Logan et al. suggest 'Valanjaca', but where that is is also uncertain.) If the Zamorin was held at Edapalli ford, crossing the lagoon there would have gotten them only to Vypin island, which would not necessarily be a grave concern for the Portuguese, since that would not place them within marching range of Cochin.

A third possibility is that Cambalão is actually Kumbalangy and not Kumbalam – that is the peninsula directly south of Cochin. That means the Calicut army marched much further south, taking a long loop around the southern end of the Vembanad lagoon through the very southerly 'lands of Porquá'(Purakkad) (or possibly cut across at Perumbalam) and then marched north through Kumbalangy. The main reasons to contemplate this southern position are: (1) It is practically a continuous land march – if the Zamorin wanted to avoid ferry boats for his huge army, taking the long loop under the Vembanad lake was the least water-clogged option (2) it places the Portuguese position closer to Cochin – more precisely, the Zamorin would be one ford away from the Cochinese land mass, thus making it a more critical point to hold for the Portuguese; (3) Kumbalangy has Aroor to the east, which might be what the Portuguese called Arraul island, with an alternate passage to Cochin that is somewhat pointing through Palluruthy; (4) the southerly loop route to Kumbalangy passes through or near the lands of Udayamperoor (Diamper), Perumbalam (Primbalão) and/or the very southerly lands of Purakkad (Porquá), whose lords were known to have defected from Cochin to Calicut before the battle.

The drawbacks to Kumbalangy is the idea of the Calicut fleet sailing there passes even closer to Cochin than before; Aroor does not really point to Palluruthy, and it is difficult visualize where Palignard ford would have been by comparison.

(A slight variation has the ford somewhere along what is now the narrow peninsula between Kumbalangy and Kochi – that is, there might have been a tiny strait and ford somewhere there, long since disappeared. That would open the possibility that the Calicut fleet actually did not sail into the Vembanad lagoon at all, but actually sailed down the outside of it, through the Arabian Sea alone.)

=== First assault ===
Portuguese naval and battle standard featuring the Cross of Christ.

Duarte Pacheco did not have to wait long before the massive army of the Zamorin of Calicut appeared at Kumbalam ford. The army is said to have moved in and deployed their positions on the banks during the night, without anyone quite seeing them until the dawn of 31 March (Palm Sunday).

In the early morning, Zamorin's massive army of 84,000 was a startling sight to the defenders. The army was already on the banks, arrayed, with flags flying, and guns in position. The intimidating blare of the trumpets and war cries of such a massive army was too much for some of the defenders to bear. The final act in this terrifying prelude was the sudden appearance of the Calicut fleet, 160 armed ships, behind the strait's bend.

Nerves cracked before this display. Some Cochinese boats started sneaking away, others followed, and soon mass panic set in. The Cochinese boats, with their 500 Nairs, were soon all fleeing back to Cochin. Only the three anchored ships, with 90 or so Portuguese (plus two Cochinese officials) remained to face the Zamorin's army and fleet.

For Duarte Pacheco, the most immediate worry was the five Venetian guns on the shore. Most of the Indian guns were said to have about the 'range and strength of an arm-thrown stone', which posed little threat to the cotton-reinforced ships. But the Venetian guns could sink them at distance. Pacheco directed all his fire immediately upon those guns, scattering the battery crews, and kept intermittent fire focused on them to prevent them reforming. Fire was also directed at Calicut hatchet-crews which had ventured into the ford to attempt to chop down the ford-blocking stockade.

While this was going on, the Calicut fleet began to advance on the Portuguese position. But the very narrowness of the channel chosen by Pacheco had been fortuitous. It did not allow the large Calicut fleet to spread out on a broad front. Instead, they had to approach the anchored Portuguese with a very narrow front. This pitted the three Portuguese ships against only a dozen or so paraus at a time, something the superior Portuguese firepower might handle.

The first wave was the most difficult – some 20 boats, tightly tied to each other, advanced together, constituting some 40 bombards and 100 muskets, plus innumerable bowmen. But the tower shields and cotton sacks on the Portuguese ships worked wonders, cushioning the missiles and allowing the Portuguese crossbowmen, musketeers and gunners to pick off the gunners and musketeers on the Malabari boats, which had little or no protection. After a few volleys, four boats were half-sunk, the rest sufficiently damaged or covered in enough dead & wounded to be unable to proceed, and began to retire.

They were followed by a second wave of around a dozen boats. But this met much the same fate. Then a third, fourth and fifth, each faring no better. Indeed, it only got easier for the Portuguese, as the sunk, damaged and retiring paraus of earlier waves formed river obstacles (and a demoralizing sight) for the next. By midday, the Calicut fleet commanders realized this was not working, and ordered a retreat.

Throughout all this, the Zamorin's army assembled on the shores had been largely ineffective. The tower shields and nets had fended off most of their constant missile fire. Fire had to be occasionally directed to the shore, to ensure the Italian gun batteries remained out of commission and that the hatchet squads did not reach the ford's stockade.

It was a humiliating morning for the Zamorin. Chroniclers report that, in this first encounter, the Calicut army and fleet suffered some 1,300 dead, while the Portuguese suffered not a single loss.

=== Second assault ===
A week elapsed until the second assault on the Kumblam ford, on 7 April (Easter Sunday). During this interim, the caravel of Diogo Pires that had been under repair was back in shape and joined the squad at Kumbalam ford. The nau Concepção remained as sentinel before Cochin city.

The Zamorin had also been busy repairing his ships and raising more troops. This time he had decided on a diversionary tactic. While the main Calicut fleet (some 150 boats) headed towards Kumbalam, a fleet of around 70 Calicut paraus would head towards Cochin city itself and engage the nau Concepção. The point was to force Duarte Pacheco's little squad to abandon Kumbalam to rescue Cochin city, thus leaving the Kumbalam ford open for his army to cross.

As soon as he heard of this (through usual intelligence channels), the Trimumpara Raja of Cochin immediately dispatched a message to Duarte Pacheco begging him to return. Pacheco shrugged off the request at first. But around 9 AM, with the tide falling and the wind in his favor, Duarte Pacheco decided that the elements might allow him to take up the appeal. Taking one caravel and one batel, and leaving the remaining pair behind to hold the ford, Pacheco raced up towards Cochin. He arrived just as the nau Concepção was in the process of desperately fending off a heavy assault by the Calicut squad. Seeing Pacheco's two ships coming in from the rear, the Calicut squad realized they were about to be trapped in the crossfire and quickly broke off the engagement and retired.

Pacheco did not pause for greetings or inquiries, but immediately turned his boats around and raced back to the Kumbalam pass. The high tide was coming in and the wind was changing. He arrived back at Kumbalam ford just in time to anchor himself in with the others and prepare to meet the bulk of the Calicut fleet, now bearing down on the ford.

The same scene was played out as the week before – Calicut paraus forced to advance in small narrow waves, etc. And it was just as fruitless. After losing around 19 ships to heavy damage and some 290 dead, the Calicut admiral called off the attack. The diversionary gambit had failed.

=== Third assault ===
The next day, rather than resting and recuperating, Duarte Pacheco launched a surprise attack on some small villages on nearby islands, which were said to have furtively supplied paraus to the Calicut fleet. The value of the target itself was not much. Its principal purpose was to unsettle the Zamorin's army psychologically, reminding them that despite all the terrible fighting and casualties of the previous day, the Portuguese were still unscathed and in fresh fighting form.

The day after that (Tuesday, 9 April), the Zamorin decided on a new tactic. There would be no more impetuous fleet attacks. The fleet was ordered to hold back until Portuguese ships were sunk or severely damaged by shore cannon. To this end, the Calicut batteries carefully positioned and shielded their Venetian cannons.

The battle opened with a barrage from land on the Portuguese ships. But while the Venetian guns had the range to hit the ships, the relatively inexperienced battery crews did not have the aim – certainly not from that distance. Duarte Pacheco apprised the situation quickly, and forbade the ships from firing back. His intention was to give the Calicut battery crews confidence and induce them to move their guns forward for better aim (and expose themselves).

Pacheco's ruse worked better than he expected. As the guns on the Portuguese ships fell silent, and they just sat there quietly, allowing themselves to be fired upon from land without firing back, the Calicut captains were quick to conclude that the Portuguese must have run out of ammunition. At this point, the Zamorin's cautious plan broke down. Not only did the cannon batteries begin to move out of their shielded positions, the Calicut fleet which had been idling at the mouth of the strait, warily watching the Portuguese, decided this was a golden opportunity. With Portuguese guns out of ammunition, it would be a simple matter for the paraus to rush, grapple, board and overwhelm the Portuguese with their numbers. They impetuously launched themselves downriver towards the Portuguese squad.

Duarte Pacheco held fire until the first wave of paraus came close enough, then launched a barrage at point blank range, sinking eight paraus in one massive volley of cannon and musket fire, causing an extraordinary number of casualties. The first wave was broken, but the remainder of the paraus had moved too far forward to pull back now. The very thing the Zamorin had wanted to avoid, was now too late – the fleet was engaging. And it played out as before – small fruitless waves after waves of paraus, broken successively and calmly by Portuguese gunfire. The Venetian gun batteries, now unwisely forward and exposed, were silenced by occasional direct fire on the battery crews.

By noon, however, one of the Portuguese bateis had caught fire, forcing the crew to divide their attentions. The next wave of Calicut paraus concentrated all their efforts on it, hoping to permanently take at least one of the four Portuguese platforms out of commission. But the crew managed to put out the fire, and fend off the attack.

By the end of the day, the Calicut fleet retired, having lost 22 paraus and some 600 dead. Despite the exhaustion of the crews, Pacheco ordered his two bateis to give a brief pursuit on the retreating fleet. A little along the way, the bateis disembarked some soldiers near Edapalli, burned down two small villages, and defeated the guard a local lord had rushed to save them.

Despite all this action, the Portuguese, again, suffered not a single death, just a few injured.

The Zamorin was demoralized after this assault, and is said to have retired into his tents, in a melancholic mood. Already after the second assault, the Zamorin is said to have realized the pointlessness of repeated attacks on the Kumbalam ford, and had even half-made up his mind to dissolve the campaign and start peace negotiations, rather than subject himself to further humiliations. But he was urged on by his noble captains to give it another try, to restore his honor and keep the faith of his vassals. But now these very same captains, by their impetuosity, had delivered him a third defeat.

== Passes of Palignar and Palurte ==
The Zamorin was disposed to call off the campaign, if not for the pressure of his commanders, who proposed to abandon Kumbalam and try to reach Cochin via two passages further north – Palignar and Palurte.

=== Location of the passes ===
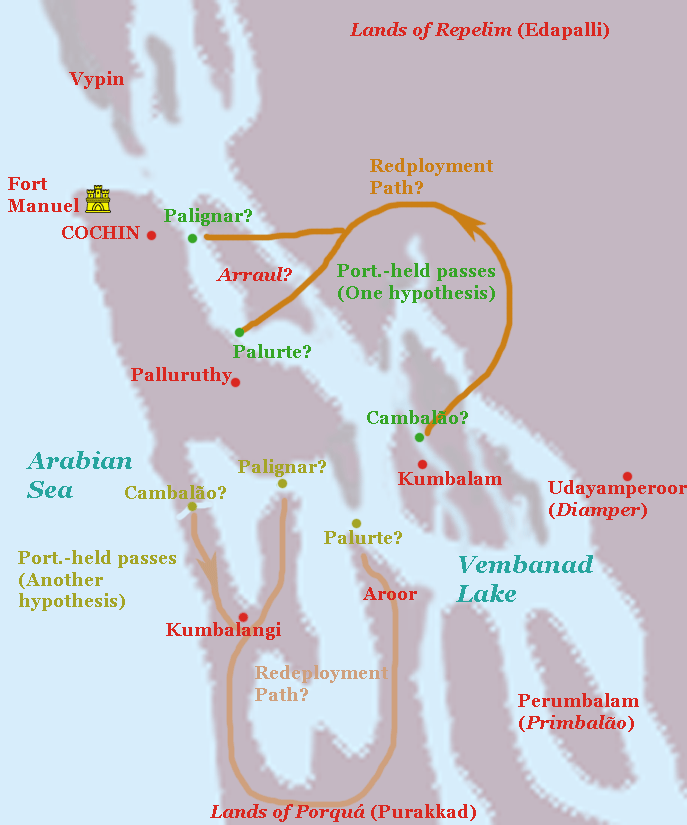
Conjectural map showing several possible positions of the passes of 'Palignar' and 'Palurte' held by the Portuguese in May–June, 1504. Again highly conjectural. Dark green = one possible hypothesis of position; Light green: another hypothesis of positions. Also shows implied route of redeployment by the army of Calicut from their original position at 'Cambalão'.

Palurte is almost definitely Palluruthy, south of Cochin. The location of Palignar (alternatively given as Palinhar, Palinhard, Palignard, Pallinganad, Palimbão) is Panangad an island east of Kumbalam, south of Ernakulam, studded in the Vambanad River. All we know of Palignar is that it is a league or half-league from Palurte (either to the north or south – surprisingly unclear in the chronicles). 'Palignar' (or similar-sounding counterparts) is not easily found in usual geographies of the Kerala backwaters.

The chronicles suggest that the passages went via the island of Arraul (or Darraul or Arrail). This could be a reference to Aroor, a southerly peninsula, that indeed might be crossed north towards Palluruthy. Of course, this would require us to consider the location of the original 'Cambalão' to be Kumbalangy (rather than Kumbalam). This is not outlandish – as Aroor is indeed behind Kumbalangy and it does accord with occasional suggestions (e.g. Castanheda, p. 228) that the main encampment of the Zamorin's army between these assaults were in the 'lands of Porquá' (probably Purakkad, thus a reference to the southern end of the Vembanad lagoon).

However, picking Aroor as 'Arraul' does not really seem to give us an intuitive idea of where Palignar & Palurte might be relative to each other. Geographies of Kerala backwaters show there are plenty of places with'Aroor'/'Aryoor'- sounding names in the region. And in the documents we have of the Trimumpara's title, he cites his lordship of Arraul as third in importance (after Cochin and Vypin), suggesting it should not be obscure or a great distance away. Moreover, there are suggestions (e.g. Castanheda, pp. 224, 227) that the fighting was very close to Cochin city and Fort Manuel. Finally, some of the chronicles suggest that the route via Arraul was a rather direct passage to Cochin city – indeed, the very passage taken by the Zamorin's armies in the first siege of 1503.

As a result, one probable hypothesis is that Arraul island might be modern Willingdon Island in Kochi harbor (or rather underlying island located there previously, as most of Willingdon was artificially created in the 1920s). Thus 'Palignar' and 'Palurte' were passes through it that entered directly onto the landmass where Cochin city sits.

However, all this is speculative conjecture. There is no agreement among chronicles, scholars or historians on any of these locations.

=== Redeployment to Arraul ===
Chroniclers claim that Palignar (Panangad)-Palurte (Palluruthi) crossings via Arraul (Aroor) island were available and unprotected during the Kumbalam ford attacks, but that the Zamorin never attempted them because the Kumbalam destination, once fixed, "became a point of honor" to adhere to. Moreover, the northerly passages were covered by dense forests and thickets unsuitable for the easy passage of his large army. But the biggest drawback is that they were not easily passed – that is, Palignar was only fordable on foot at low tide, whereas Palurte required ferry boats. But such considerations were now set aside. The principal advantage of the Arraul passages is that they were two – that is, that the Portuguese would not be able to defend both Palignar and Palurte simultaneously.

In late April, the Zamorin lifted his camp at Kumbalam and began to withdraw – seemingly back to Calicut. But Duarte Pacheco Pereira soon received notice that Zamorin's army was in fact heading to the Palignar-Palurte passes, and that advanced troops of the Zamorin, some 500 Nairs, were already on Arraul island, cutting down thickets to ease the passage of the army. Pacheco rushed with a couple of boats up to Arraul, while the Trimumpara Raja dispatched an army of some 200 Cochinese Nairs from Cochin city to join him there. Pacheco took command of them, divided them into two columns, one under himself another under Pêro Rafael, and drove the thicket-cutters back.

Duarte Pacheco set about organizing his position before the arrival of the rest of the Calicut army, estimated to be but a mere one day way. His caravels could only go as far as Palurte ferry – lack of water depth prevented the caravels from advancing beyond that. So Pacheco ordered the two caravels (under Pêro Rafael and Diogo Pires) to anchor in at Palurte with iron cords, while he proceeded with the two smaller bateis on to Palignar ford.

At Palignar, Duarte Pacheco anchored both his bateis on the bank, placing them under the command Simão de Andrade and Cristóvão Jusarte [Note: Correa (p. 402) calls the latter "Jusarte Pacheco" or "Lisuarte Pacheco", and identifies him as the son of Duarte Pacheco]. The near bank of the ford was to be held by a 600-strong force of Cochinese Nairs dispatched by the Trimumpara Raja, under the command of his nephew and heir, Unni Goda Varda (Candagora). The factor's assistant, Lourenço Moreno, apparently bored of Fort Manuel and wanting some action, showed up at the ford and was assigned to either take command of a land entrenchment or aboard some Cochinese canoes. But perhaps the most critical step, Duarte Pacheco ordered the troops and crews to clear the opposite banks of vegetation, so as to deprive enemy archers and cannons any form of protective cover.

The critical key to Duarte Pacheco's defense was the tides. Although forced to defend two passages, he realized he did not have to defend them both at once. Palignar ford could only be crossed on foot at low tide, during which time the water at Palurte is too shallow for the Zamorin's ships and ferry boats to move. At high tide, boats could move at Palurte, but the infantry could not ford at Palignar. So Duarte Pacheco calculated he could shuttle himself and some of his forces back and forth via shallow launches between the two passes – reinforcing the Nairs and bateis at Palignar in low tide, and then slip down the strait to help the caravels at Palurte at high tide.

=== Fourth assault ===
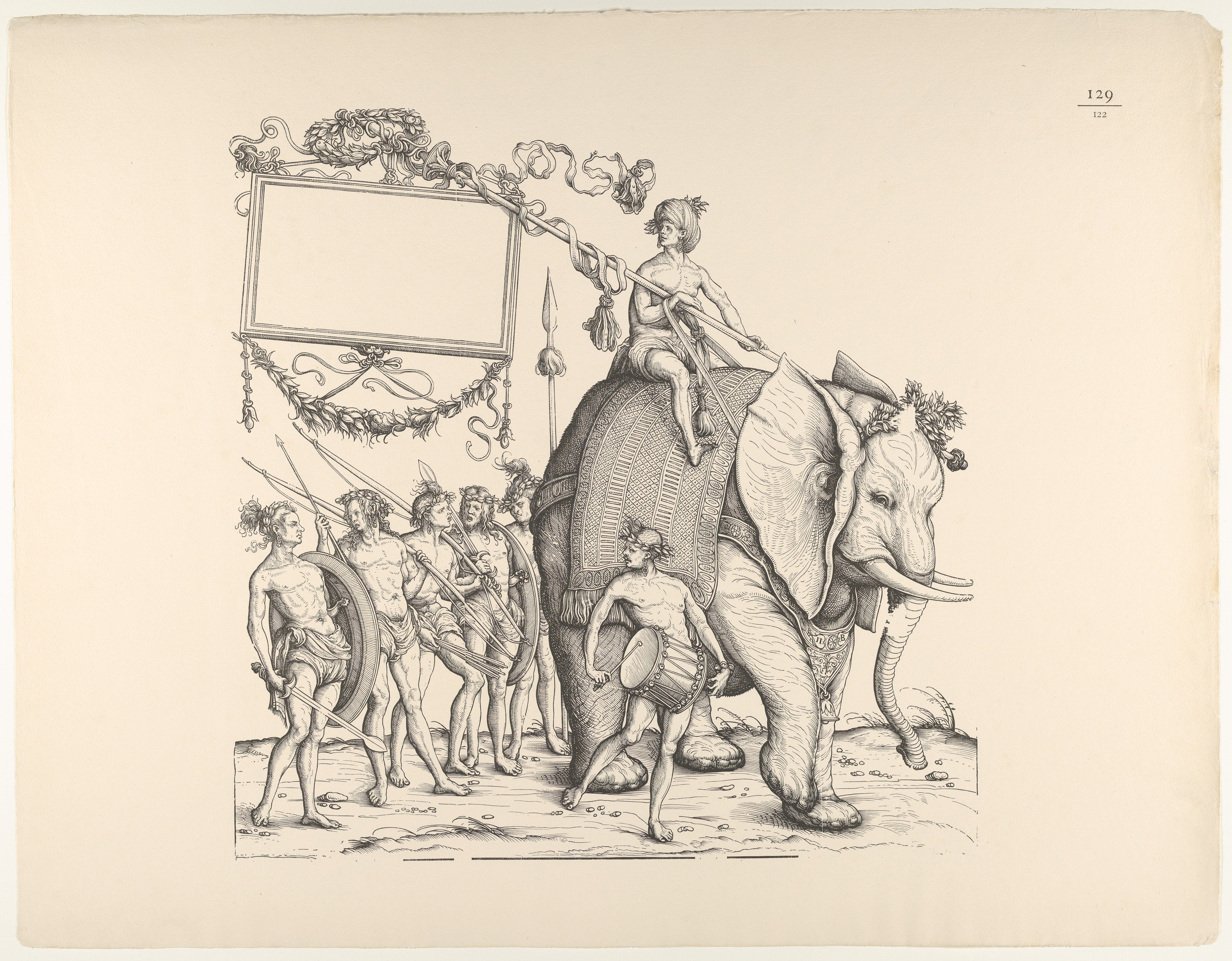
People from Calicut, depicted in a 16th century woodcut.

The vanguard of the Zamorin's army, some 15,000 infantry led by Prince Naubeadarim, arrived at Palignar ford a day or two after the skirmish at Arraul. Around the same time, the Calicut fleet, some 250 vessels under lord Ercanol of Edapalli, reached the environs of Palurte. Naubeadrim set himself to seize control of the ford with his army, leaving Ercanol to dislodge the two caravels at Palurte.

The attack began at dawn of 1 May. As the tide was high during the morning, Palignar was impassable to Naubeadarim's infantry, so Pacheco left the bateis with only a small crew under the command of Andrade and Jusarte, and rushed most of his forces on longboats down to Palurte. A contingent of Cochinese Nairs accompanied Pacheco, although the bulk stayed with prince Candagora at the near side of the Palignar ford.

The clearing of the vegetation on the opposite banks immediately paid off as, upon reaching Palurte, Pacheco easily noticed a number of Calicut cannons being rolled into position, aiming to sink the anchored caravels. Duarte Pacheco ordered concentrated fire from the ships on their position, scattering the Calicut artillery crews. He then landed a Portuguese-Cochinese assault force on the beach, who rushed up to finish off the lingering Calicut crews and dragged away or spiked the abandoned Calicut cannons.

The cannon threat nullified, the troops returned to the caravels to face the arriving Calicut fleet. The strait at Palurte was not as narrow as it had been at Kumbalam, allowing the admiral Elcanol of Edapalli to send in a substantial first wave, a broad front of 40 paraus, tied across, against the caravels. But the speed of Portuguese gunners decimated the advancing fleet. A second wave of nearly the same size was sent after it, but it was also repulsed.

By then, the tide had begun to fall, and the Calicut paraus began having trouble moving in the obstacle-ridden shallow waters of Palurte, so the Calicut admiral Ercanol ordered the fleet to retire. News quickly arrived that the Calicut infantry of Naubeadarim was getting ready to wade the passage at Palignar. Duarte Pacheco and his troops went back on their longboats.

The tide low enough, Naubeadarim's infantry column launched their assault to gain the ford. But they were unable to make much headway or reach the opposite back, held back by the rapid and heavy gunfire from the bateis and incessant missile fire from the Cochinese Nairs on the bank. After two heavy-fought but fruitless assaults, the tide began rising again, and Naubeadarim ordered the column to retire.

In this first encounter, Calicut is said to have lost some 1,000 men and a few ships. The disgusted Zamorin arrived on the scene with the rest of his army soon after, and upbraided both Naubeadarim and Elcanol for what he believed was cowardice in calling premature retreats.

The day's fight at Palignar and Palurte was probably the heaviest the Portuguese had yet faced. They had little time to prepare proper defenses and were lucky to get away with it. The Portuguese were exhausted and suffered many injured (but still no deaths, according to the chroniclers). Had the Zamorin renewed the assault the next day, his forces might very well have taken the ford. But as luck would have it, torrential downpours prevented resumption of operations, followed quickly by a devastating epidemic of cholera that swept through the Calicut camp. This gave the Portuguese and Cochin allies about a week to rest, recuperate and prepare.

=== Fifth assault ===
Duarte Pacheco used the cholera-induced break from the fighting to repair his ships and strengthen his position at Palignar ford. A strong stockade (palisade with ramparts) was erected on the near bank. Sharpened poles, burnt at one end and tied down to each other, were lodged deep into the mud throughout the ford, to severely complicate the infantry's passage. [In more detail, Saraiva (1849: p. 140) describes them as flat boards covered in upturned sharp metal spikes and large nails laid across bottom of the Palignar ford to impale the feet of the wading soldiers; he introduced the poles to serve a double role – as anchors to prevent the planks from floating away or being removed, and as stilts to hold up the planks and prevent them from sinking into the soft river mud.]

The cholera epidemic had taken a heavy toll on the Zamorin's army – more than 10,000 men were lost. The success of the resistance had also brought back some of the old Cochinese vassals who had earlier abandoned the Trimumpara Raja. According to Correia (p. 482), these were the lords (Kaimals) of Mangate (Alengad), Primbalão (Perumbalam) and Diamper (Udayamperoor). Their return was welcome less for any concrete help they might give, and more because they deprived the Zamorin of possible reinforcements.

Around 6 May (date uncertain), the Zamorin launched his biggest assault yet, concentrating all his forces on gaining the ford at Palignar. It was spearheaded by some 4,000 men with 30 brass cannons, brought forth to sink the bateis. Then came the vanguard column, some 12,000 men under Prince Naubeadarim. Ercanol of Edapalli commanded a column of the same size, and the Zamorin himself brought up the rear with some 15,000, including specialized hatchet crews (some 400) to clear the passages and chop down the stockade.

At that point, the Portuguese had a mere 40 men on the bateis at Palignar, and only some 200 Cochinese troops at the ford palisade. [Apparently, the Nairs of the Cochinese vassal lord of Mangate (Alangad), assigned to man the palisade, unexpectedly abandoned their posts during the night, leaving only this small number behind. Pacheco dispatched an urgent message to prince Candagora back in Cochin, to rush in reinforcements, but the message did not get conveyed on time.

The assault on Palignar began with a cannonade duel between the Calicut artillery on land and the bateis. The Portuguese artillery got the better of it, and the Calicut batteries were dispersed. But by this time, however, the tide was low, and the bateis, now scraping the riverbed, not easily manoeuvrable into optimal firing positions.

The Zamorin gave the order to advance, and Calicut infantry poured into the Palignar ford, to regain the other bank. The spiked planks had their intended effect – the front lines slowed down to watch their step, the rear lines shoved them from behind, and the Calicut army clustered up into a concentrated mob. Portuguese cannons directed their fire on this dense human mass, causing horrific numbers of casualties in the Calicut ranks. Nonetheless, urged on by their officers, the Calicut infantry kept pressing forward.

Pêro Rafael directed some of the fire to assassinate the Zamorin himself, and a cannonball landed near enough to his person to cut two of the nobles standing near him to pieces. The blood-covered Zamorin was hurried off the field by his guard, leaving the rest of the assault to Naubeadarim and Ercanol. Enraged at the assassination attempt, Naubeadarim rallied the Calicut troops and pressed forward furiously. Painfully working over the impaling spikes, the vanguard finally reached the palisade on the Cochinese bank. It is said that the Cochinese troops manning the ramparts fell back or fled their positions, and the few Portuguese stationed there were given up for lost.

But by this time the tide had begun to rise again, and the bateis were dislodged from the mud and freely manoeuvrable once more. The bateis rushed forward, straight into the ford, and with concentrated fire, broke up the heavy assault on the palisade. Then crossing the ford back and forth with near-point blank cannon, forced the Calicut troops back on to the banks to retreat to the tree line.

After nine hours of intense fighting, the high tide was back and the assault was over. The Zamorin's army had failed once again.

Duarte Pacheco was furious with the Cochinese troops who abandoned the palisade ramparts in the heat of the battle, and even more furious with the troops of the vassal lord of Mangate who had deserted their posts before the fight even began. But Trimumpara Raja sadly reminded him of the general faithlessness of all his vassals, and assured Pacheco that it would not happen again, that his heir, the prince Cadangora, would move to the ford permanently, and supervise the maintenance of the stockade.

It is said that sometime during this encounter a detachment of around 2,000 Calicut Nairs, using a different little-used passage (or perhaps landed by paraus), managed to circumvent and land behind Portuguese lines. The Nairs were making their way to launch a surprise attack on the ford from the rear, when some local Cochinese peasants working in the rice fields, plucked up their courage and attacked the detachment with their spades, seeing them off rather quickly. Allegedly, the Indian caste system played a significant role, the Nairs fearing defilement by low caste peasants more than any injury from the agricultural implements they were wielding. Pacheco, disgusted with his own Cochinese Nairs, is said to have tried to persuade the Trimumpara Raja to promote these brave peasants to Nairs and assign them to the palisade. The King gave him a lengthy lecture on the intricacies of the caste system.

=== Plots and skirmishes ===
The depressed Zamorin had no stomach for another failure in the field and dismissed ideas of a renewed direct assault. Delay was also forced by a renewed breakout of the cholera epidemic. Instead, there were just a series of underhanded plots and occasional skirmishes seeking to weaken or draw out the Portuguese position at the passes.

As usual, intelligence networks in south India ensured most of the Zamorin's plots were leaked. Already earlier, the Zamorin's agents had induced a conspiracy by some Cochinese Nairs to assassinate Duarte Pacheco. The plot was uncovered, and Pacheco had two of them flogged and hanged. (This caused some consternation in Cochinese ranks, as while the execution was acceptable, the flogging of a Nair was a grievous insult to the noble caste. Not wishing to provoke trouble among the Nairs, Duarte Pacheco handed the remaining conspirators over to the Trimumpara Raja to do with them as he will.)

During this interlude, the Zamorin's advisors devised a new plan to have agents infiltrate Cochin and bribe victuallers to poison the food and water being sent out to the troops at Palignar ford. But as usual, the plot was leaked. To ensure themselves, new wells were dug on the beaches at Palignar on a daily basis, and victuallers, vendors and transporters were forced to taste their own food at every stage before being distributed to the army.

The Zamorin's advisors kept concocting more plots – an uprising in Cochin, then a plan to send in boats under the cover of night to Cochin and set the city on fire, then to sneak baskets of venomous cobras aboard the Portuguese ships, etc. But all these plots were quickly foiled by leaked intelligence.

In one of the more infamous instances (reported by Correia, pp. 474–75), the Zamorin determined on a night attack. The troops were to cross a ford near Palurte, hitherto unutilized because it was within shot range of the anchored Portuguese caravels. But at night, the caravels would not see them and the troops could wade across. That evening, two Calicut armies set out – the vanguard to go first, and give a torch signal to the second army to advance after they had crossed the ford. But as usual, Pacheco got wind of the plan. And not long after the vanguard started their march, Pacheco gave the pre-arranged torch signal himself and got the second army to advance prematurely. The vanguard, thinking they were being ambushed from behind by a Cochinese column, turned around and attacked the second army. In the dark of the night, the two armies of Calicut did not notice they were fighting each other!

During the interlude, Pacheco repeatedly launched his own excursions to harass the Calicut encampment and raid supporting villages. On one of these excursions, Pacheco is said to have been ambushed and surrounded by a Calicut fleet of some 54 paraus, but managed to defeat them.

=== Sixth assault ===
Preparations for a new assault on Palignar ford began sometime in late May (or possibly June.) 30,000 troops were assembled for the new assault on Palignar. The artillery was moved into pre-prepared trench-lines, where the batteries would be better shielded from Portuguese return-fire.

Against Palurte, Elacanol of Edapalli repaired and prepared the fleet anew – the vanguard led by 110 well-armed and well-shielded paraus, tied together, followed by some 100 boat transports, packed with soldiers for the grapple. There were a few innovations – firstly, a series of fire-boats (brulotes), loaded with incendiary material, were prepared, intended to be sent into the Portuguese caravels. Then, most peculiar of all, a series of 'floating castles' (invented by a certain 'Cogeale', an 'Arab of Edapalli'). Essentially, a 'floating castle' was a wooden siege tower, about 18 hands tall, with heavily reinforced sides, capable of carrying 40 armed men, mounted on two paraus lashed together. There were eight such castles, mounted on 16 boats, tied to each other, forming a single imposing line.

As usual, Duarte Pacheco was aware of all these preparations, and had himself taken counter-measures. Against the fire-boats, he ordered the construction of a wide raft (mounted with masts), which he anchored firmly across the strait. Hearing of the floating castles, he ordered the erection of wooden structures on the prows of his caravels, to match the height of the Calicut castles.

Candagora, prince and heir of Cochin, presented himself with one thousand of the best Cochinese Nairs at Palignar ford. The two bateis at Palignar were, as usual, under the command of Cristóvão Jusarte and Simão de Andrade, while Lourenço Moreno, the factor's assistant, was placed in command of some Cochinese boats.

On the dawn of the day of the attack, the Zamorin's infantry began their march towards Palignar. To taunt the sea-king, Pacheco sailed in a boat up to the tip of Arraul island and landed with a small squad to engage in a skirmish with the advance squads of the Calicut army. The irritated Zamorin redirected a large detachment of his forces after him. Pacheco just climbed back on his boat and sailed away.

The tide being high, the battle began at Palurte, where the caravels were anchored. The Calicut fire ships were the first to be launched – but they were caught by the anchored raft and burned harmlessly. The row of floating castles were then launched against the caravels. This proved more difficult, as their reinforced sides seemed to resist all the cannon fire the Portuguese had to offer. The situation seemed bleak and Duarte Pacheco is said to have desperately uttered his famous line: "Lord, don't make me pay for my sins just yet", before focusing concentrated heavy fire on the nearest approaching castle and finally breaking its sides. A second soon followed, and the whole apparatus began to drag and fragment, the paraus to sink. [According to Correia (p. 487) Pacheco is said to have offered a bounty of 100 cruzados to any sailor who dared swim out with a torch and set fire to the paraus underneath the castles.

While the caravels at Palurt were thus engaged, the tide had come down and the Zamorin's infantry marched on Palignar ford. Incessant gunfire from the two bateis, joined by continuous missile fire from the Cochinese on the palisade ramparts and in the launches, mowed down line after line of Calicut infantry as they stepped into the ford. The assault was repelled, until the high tide returned and forced the armies of Calicut to end the attempted crossing.

According to Osório (p. 311), the army of Calicut suffered more casualties on this day than any other; the Portuguese still had no deaths, only wounded. The victory over the Zamorin's greatest assault yet was greeted with great festivities in Cochin.

=== Seventh assault and end ===
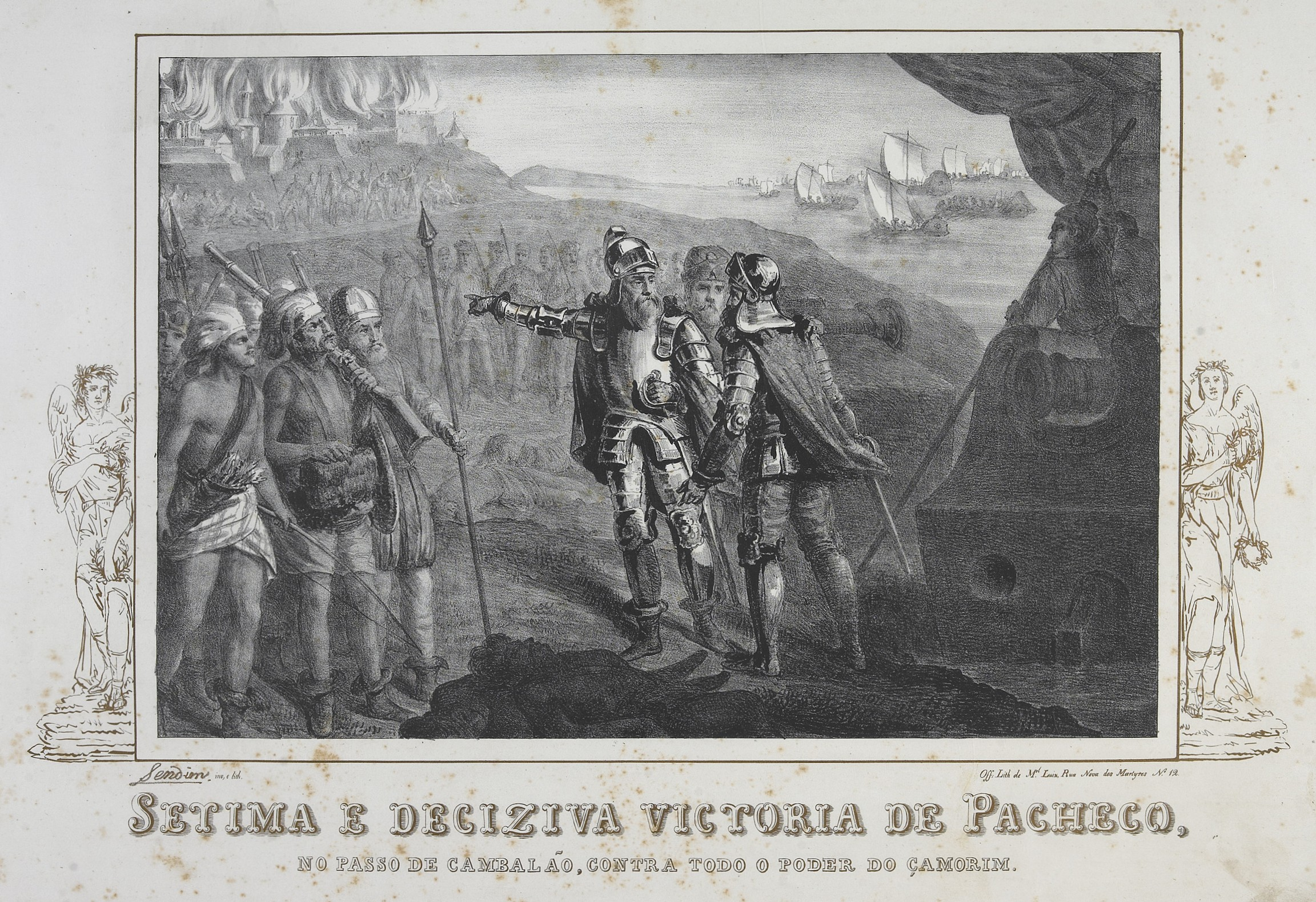
Duarte Pacheco's seventh and final victory over the Zamorin (1840 lithograph)

The chronicles are generally scant on details of the subsequent events. It seems the Zamorin ordered a couple of more assaults on the Portuguese positions, one of which used the same floating castles (now repaired), but to no avail. In these assaults, the Zamorin had fewer troops – depleted by disease and desertion – and, with less enthusiasm and energy, the attacks were largely desultory.

By now, the monsoon season had begun to turn, and the heavier rains and winds were working against the Zamorin's army – rain spread disease and complicated movement, water levels were higher at the passages, sailing the paraus more difficult. Moreover, one by one, the vassals of Calicut were sneaking away from the Zamorin's camp. It was generally anticipated that a new Portuguese armada would be arriving in August. Many of the Zamorin's vassals, having lost hope of seizing Cochin by then, figured it was best to negotiate their own peace terms with the Trimumphara Raja before the Portuguese arrived, lest their dominions be slated for vengeful punitive raids. The last of the vassals to make a separate peace with Cochin was the lord Elcanol of Edapalli himself.

Finally, on 24 June 1504 (Nativity of St. John), the Zamorin of Calicut decided he had enough, and abdicated his throne, passing it on to his nephew and heir, Naubeadaraim (the general who had led the Calicut infantry), and retired to a temple, dedicating himself to religious life. But the tired Zamorin was lured by the chiding of his own mother to emerge from the temple and organize one last assault. But after that failed to go anywhere, the Zamorin returned to religious seclusion permanently. The army of Calicut retired from the shores of the Vembanad lagoon around 3 July.

=== Aftermath ===
Immediately after the Zamorin withdrew his forces from the vicinity of Cochin (some say early August, 1504), Duarte Pacheco Pereira, set sail with his caravels out of Cochin for Quilon. There were rumors that Arab traders in the city had raised a conspiracy or riot and attacked the Portuguese factory there, killing at least one Portuguese agent. Almeida captured a squad of Arab merchant ships and exacted his revenge on them.

Pacheco was still settling matters in Quilon when the 6th Portuguese India armada, under the command of Lopo Soares de Albergaria reached Cochin in September 1504. Duarte Pacheco returned to Cochin in late September or October to meet him there.

In October, Pacheco participated in a pre-emptive Portuguese-Cochinese raid on Cranganore, where it was said the (new) Zamorin was re-assembling his army, to attack Cochin again after the 6th Armada left in January. The razing of Cranganore and the subsequent defection of the ruler of Tanur, one of the Zamorin's most important vassals, rolled the Calicut frontline north, and placed the Vembanad lagoon out of the reach of the Zamorin's army and fleet. It put an end to any prospect of the Zamorin of Calicut attacking Cochin again via the Kerala backwaters.

== Assessment ==
Overall, the Battle of Cochin lasted some five months – from March to July, with most of the assaults concentrated in early April and early May. The Zamorin's army, which started out at more than 60,000 strong, had suffered heavy casualties: 19,000 had died, over 5,000 in fighting and 13,000 to disease. Wounded were innumerable, ship losses numerous.

There are no reported deaths of any of the Portuguese defenders – although many were wounded. Casualties among the Cochinese allies are unknown, but they were also probably not that high, given the few numbers that were actually committed to battle.

The battle of Cochin transformed the political landscape of Kerala. The Zamorin of Calicut was humiliated. His mighty army and fleet was unable to crush a minuscule garrison of 150 Portuguese allied with Cochin. By the end, the Zamorin lost most of the authority and fear in which he had been previously held throughout the Malabar Coast, while the Trimumpara Raja had gone from weak king to acknowledged king of the Vembanad lagoon.

The Portuguese, led by Duarte Pacheco Pereira succeeded by a combination of clever positioning, individual heroics and a lot of luck. The Zamorin had demonstrated a bit of resourcefulness and innovation of his own – no two attacks were the same – but failed nonetheless.

Ultimately it was probably the role of intelligence networks of Cochin that proved the critical difference. The Portuguese were fully informed of everything that was going on in the enemy camp, all the way to strategies and plots hatched secretly inside the Zamorin's tent. The Portuguese, by contrast, tended to keep their own counsel, the Zamorin's spies could only see, but not hear, what the Portuguese were up to. Pereira may have also been the first person to have done a scientific study of the relationship between tides and lunar phases, and this allowed him to predict when each ford would be passable and to shuttle his few forces accordingly to meet points of attack.

For the Portuguese, it was a 'close-run thing'. Had Cochin fallen to the Zamorin, it was likely Cannanore and Quilon would have fallen suit (indeed, talks were already in progress for that eventuality). The Portuguese would lose their foothold in India, and unlikely to recover it easily – the Zamorin could use Fort Manuel to keep the future Portuguese armadas at bay. The Portuguese would likely be forced to sue for peace on the Zamorin's terms.

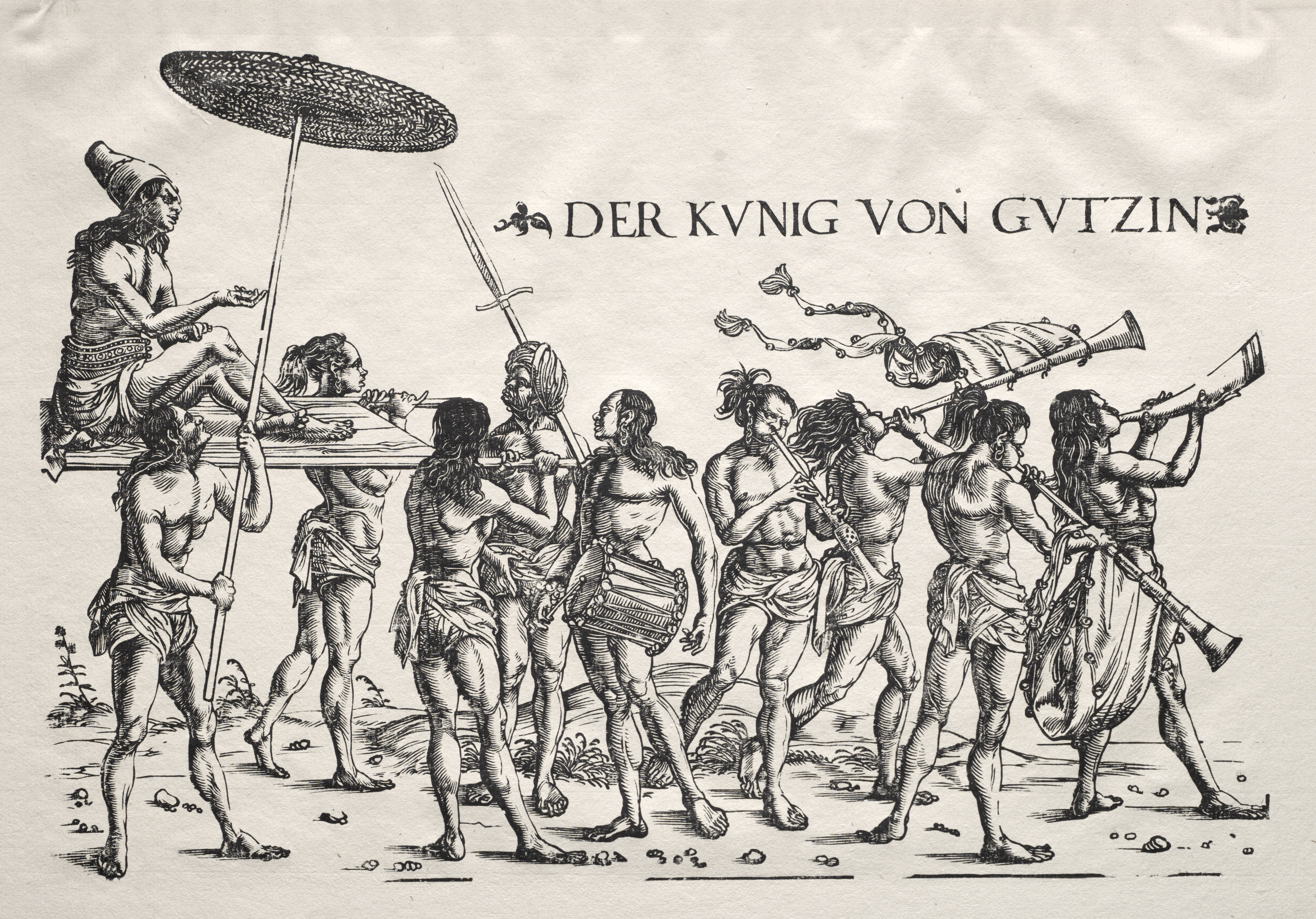
The king of Cochin depicted in an early 16th century woodcut.

The Trimumpara Raja came out the victor. His stubbornness in maintaining the Portuguese alliance, which everyone had advised him against and which, at the beginning of the year, seemed to seal his doom, had paid off. He had debt to the Portuguese, but to none so as big as to Duarte Pacheco himself, to whom he had, in the course of the desperate battle, become affectionately attached.

=== Rewards of Duarte Pacheco ===
In the aftermath of the battle, in his capacity as King of Cochin, the Trimumpara Raja gave Duarte Pacheco Pereira a personal grant of arms, described as a red shield ("for the immense blood of the Calicut which he shed in this war"), with five golden crowns in saltire ("for the five kings he defeated") and a white bordure with blue waves, charged with eight wooden castles in green, each mounted on two ships ("for the two times he defeated these eight castles"). Around the shield, are seven pennants, three red, two white, two blue ("for the seven assaults led by the King of Calecut in person and the seven flags of these colors and shapes he seized"), and an open silver helm, mantled in gold and red, and for crest a castle topped with a red pennant (for Cochin?).

Duarte Pacheco Pereira was relieved as commander of Fort Manuel of Cochin by Manuel Teles de Vasconcelos, and set to return to Portugal with the 6th Armada in January 1505. The Trimumpara Raja is said to have been beside himself with tears at Duarte Pacheco's departure, and pleaded endlessly with the admiral Lopo Soares de Albergaria to allow him to stay. Bowing to inevitability, the Trimumpara Raja offered Duarte Pacheco a substantial cargo of black pepper as a personal reward for his services. Knowing how the Trimumpara Raja had been impoverished by the war, Duarte Pacheco declined the offer.

Duarte Pacheco Pereira was given a hero's welcome back in Lisbon, receiving a grand reception and royal pension from King Manuel I of Portugal and public festivities were held in his honor.

In 1505, the first Portuguese vice-roy D. Francisco de Almeida arrived in India with a golden crown sent by King Manuel I of Portugal to reward the steadfastness of the Trimumpara Raja of Cochin in his Portuguese alliance. But the old Trimumpara Raja had abdicated by this time and taken up a life of religious devotion; it was his heir, Candagora, who was crowned in a solemn ceremony by Almeida as 'King of Cochin'.

=== Esmeraldo de Situ Orbis ===
During the lulls in the fighting at the Battle of Cochin, Duarte Pacheco Pereira spent much time making cosmographic observations and taking notes. Upon his return to Lisbon in 1505, Duarte Pacheco would compile these notes into his famous book, Esmeraldo de Situ Orbis, finished in 1509. It is one of the first roteiros (nautical rutters) giving precise instructions and references for future navigators on the India run.

Of particular importance was the careful notes Duarte Pacheco took on the timing of the tides, which played such a critical importance in the course of the Battle of Cochin. Pacheco is said to have been the first to notice their connection to the moon and establish rules for predicting the progress of tides by reference to lunar observations. He also sifted through his data to correct and improve astronomical observations (notably correcting the average daily deviation of the moon from the sun) and constructing nautical measurements to be used by future Portuguese navigators.

=== Later representations ===
The story of the Battle of Cochin is related by the Portuguese poet Luís de Camões in his 1572 epic poem Os Lusíadas. At the opening of Canto X, the sea-nymph Thetis relates to the admiral Vasco da Gama her prophecy about the Battle of Cochin (Canto X, Stanzas 12–21). Camões places this battle at the forefront, the first significant event involving the Portuguese in India after Gama's voyage. He showers Duarte Pacheco Pereira with superlatives, "the strongest of the strong", the "Lusitan Achilles", and describes some of the more memorable incidents and details of the battle. Thetis also darkly predicts Duarte Pacheco's future travails upon his return to Portugal, bewailing the ingratitude of King Manuel I of Portugal, that although Pacheco "gave [him] a wealthy kingdom", he was granted no high rewards, and instead hints at the courtly intrigues and charges that led to his arrest later in life.(St. 22–25).

== Sources ==
=== Chronicles ===
- João de Barros (1552–59) Décadas da Ásia: Dos feitos, que os Portuguezes fizeram no descubrimento, e conquista, dos mares, e terras do Oriente.. [Dec. I, Lib 7.]
- Fernão Lopes de Castanheda (1551–1560) História do descobrimento & conquista da Índia pelos portugueses [1833 edition]
- Gaspar Correia (c. 1550s) Lendas da Índia, first pub. 1858-64, in Lisbon: Academia Real das Sciencias.
- Manuel de Faria e Sousa (1666–75) Asia Portuguesa, 3 vols.
- Damião de Góis (1566–67) Crónica do Felicíssimo Rei D. Manuel
- Thomé Lopes "Navegação as Indias Orientaes, escrita em Portuguez por Thomé Lopes, traduzida da lingua Portugueza para a Italiana, e novamente do Italiano para o Portuguez", trans. 1812 into Portuguese, by Academia Real das Sciencias in Collecção de noticias para a historia e geografia das nações ultramarinas: que vivem nos dominios portuguezes, ou lhes são visinhas, Vol. 2, Pt. 5
- Jerónimo Osório (1586) De rebus Emmanuelis, 1804 trans. Da Vida e Feitos d'El Rei D. Manuel, Lisbon: Impressão Regia.
- Duarte Pacheco Pereira (c. 1509) Esmeraldo de Situ Orbis online

=== Secondary ===
- Bell, A.F. (1917) "Duarte Pacheco Pereira, 1465–1533", Portuguese Portraits, Oxford: Blackwell
- Dames, M.L. (1918) "Introduction" in An Account Of The Countries Bordering On The Indian Ocean And Their Inhabitants, Vol. 1 (Engl. transl. of Livro de Duarte de Barbosa), 2005 reprint, New Delhi: Asian Education Services.
- Danvers, F.C. (1894) The Portuguese in India, being a history of the rise and decline of their eastern empire. 2 vols, London: Allen.
- Day, F. (1863) The Land of the Permauls, or, Cochin, its past and its present. Madras: Adelphi.
- Logan, W. (1887) Malabar Manual, 2004 reprint, New Delhi: Asian Education Services.
- Mathew, K.N. (1988) History of the Portuguese Navigation in India. New Delhi: Mittal.
- Mathew, K.S. (1997) "Indian Naval Encounters with the Portuguese: Strengths and weaknesses", in Kurup, editor, India's Naval Traditions, New Delhi: Northern Book Centre.
- Monteiro, S. (1989) Batalhas e Combates da Marinha Portuguesa, Vol. 1 (1139–1521) Lisbon: Sa da Costa.
- Saraiva, F. S.L. (1849) Os Portuguezes em Africa, Asia, America, e Occeania, Vol. 2, Lisbon: Borges.
- Whiteway, R. S. (1899) The Rise of Portuguese Power in India, 1497–1550. Westminster: Constable.
