= Perumbalam Bridge =

Bridge in Kerala, India

Perumbalam Bridge പെരുമ്പളം പാലം
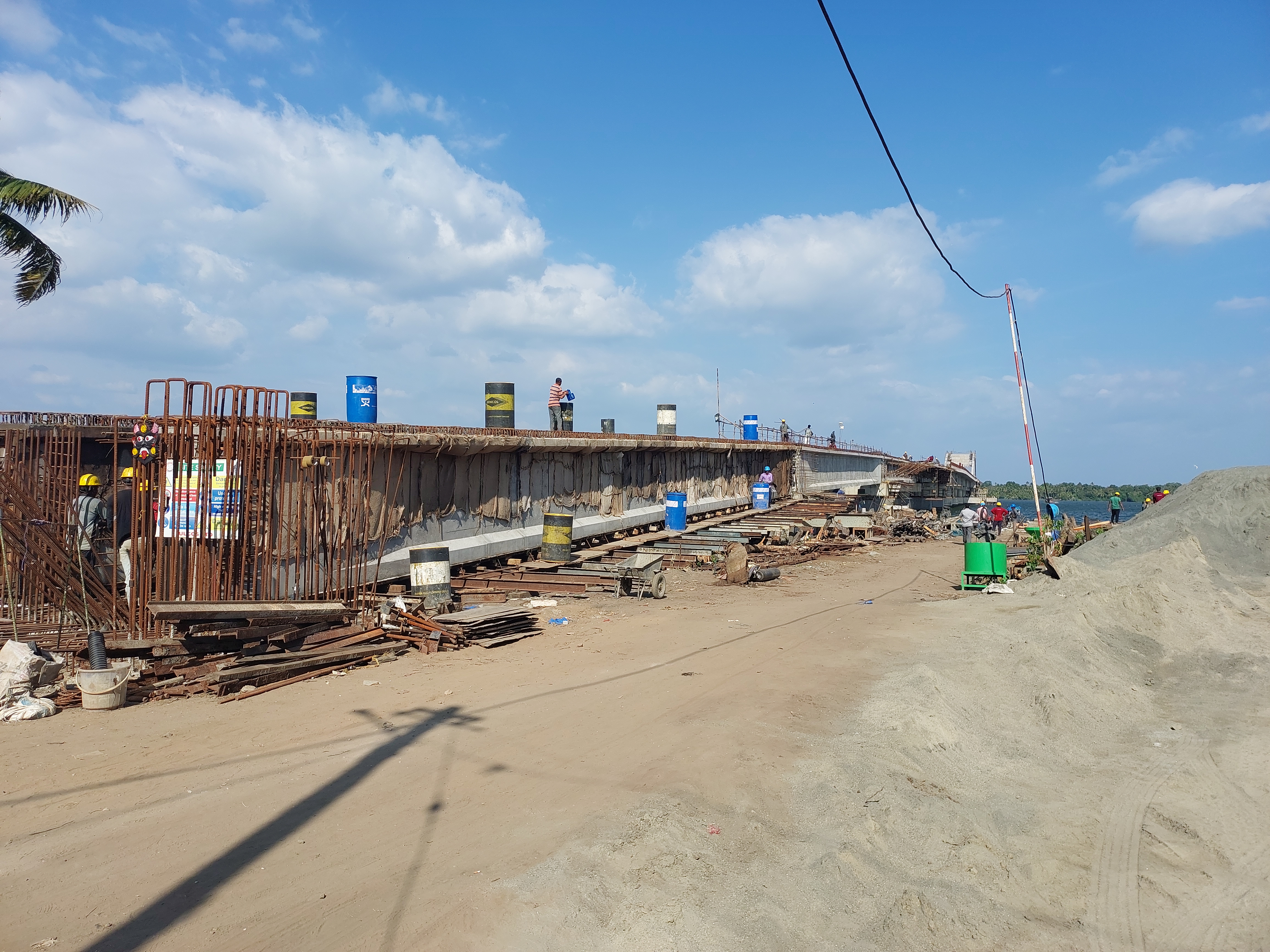
- Perumbalam Bridge while under construction in 2023 December
- Coordinates: 9°51′27″N 76°20′37″E
- Crosses: Vembanad lake
- Locale: Perumbalam, Alappuzha district, Kerala
- Owner: Government of Kerala

Characteristics
- Total length: 1115 m
- Width: 11 m
- Longest span: 55 m
- No. of spans: 27

History
- Constructed by: Uralungal Labour Contract Co-operative Society
- Construction start: 2019
- Construction end: 2026
- Opened: 2026 March 07
- Inaugurated: Chief Minister Pinarayi Vijayan

Location
- Interactive map of Perumbalam Bridge

The Perumbalam bridge, also known as Perumbalam-Panavally Bridge, is a bow string arch bridge in Alappuzha district in Kerala, India. It was opened to the public on 07 March 2026. It spans across the Vembanad lake to connect the village island Perumbalam to the mainland Arookutty. The 1,157-metre-long bridge, built across the Vembanad Lake, is the longest bridge constructed across a lake in Kerala.

== Overview ==
Perumbalam in Alappuzha district is the largest island village in Kerala. Before the construction of the bridge, the people of Perumbalam depended on boats and jankar services to connect with mainland areas (Arookutty and Panavally) in the district of Alappuzha. Although the locals have been raising the demand for the bridge for the past five decades, the state government inaugurated the construction of the bridge in 2019. Meanwhile, another construction company, Cherian Varki Construction Company, filed a lawsuit against Uralungal labour society, which had contracted the construction of bridge, and the government. This resulted in the delay of the project. The Kerala High Court finally ruled in favor of Uralungal society and the government, and the construction work was resumed in late 2021.

The total construction cost for the project is nearly 100 crores. It is being implemented with the funds of KIFBI from the Government of Kerala. The bridge has a length of 1157 m and width of 11 m. The span of the bridge is 11.0 m with 27 spans of 35 m length and 3 bow string arch spans of 55 m length. The carriageway has a width of 7.5 m and the footpaths on both sides have a width of 1.5 m.

Along with its inauguration, bus services to Perumbalam island from Cherthala depot were also started by KSRTC.
