= Pathiramanal =

- island
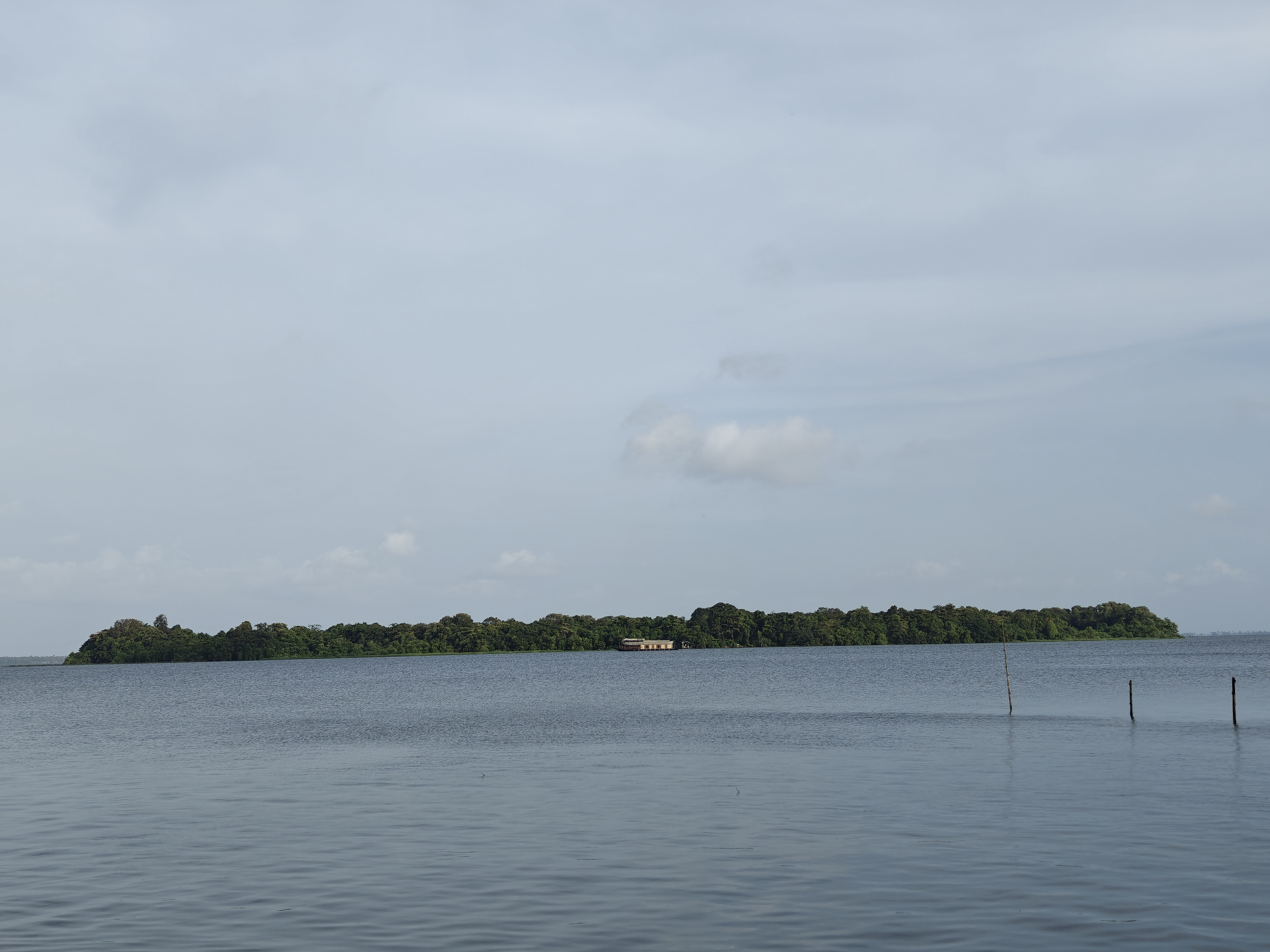
- Pathiramanal Island

- Location in Kerala, India Pathiramanal (India)
- Coordinates: 9°37′7″N 76°23′6″E
- Country: India
- State: Kerala
- District: Alappuzha

Government
  - Body: Gram panchayat

Languages
  - Official: Malayalam, English
- Time zone: UTC+5:30 (IST)
- PIN: 688525
- Vehicle registration: KL-32
- Nearest city: Alappuzha, Kumarakom (Kottayam dist)

Pathiramanal is a small island in Muhamma panchayat of Alappuzha district located in Vembanad Lake. The name Pathiramanal means 'midnight sand'. It is home to many rare varieties of migratory birds from different parts of the world.

== Geography ==
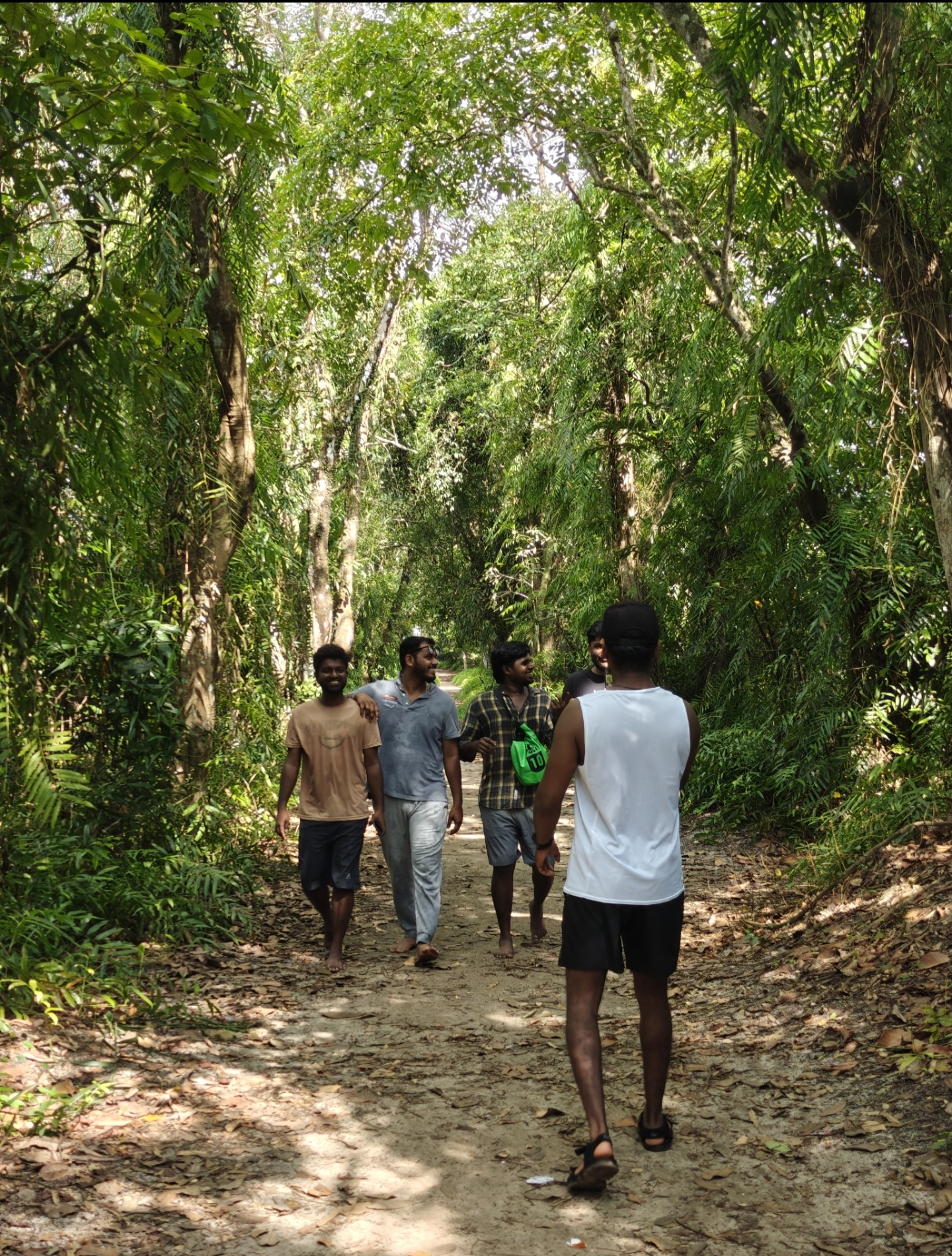
Visitors walking through Pathiramanal Island

The Pathiramanal Island is 28.505 ha. It is about 1.5 km from Muhamma boat jetty and about 13 km from Alapuzha. From the jetty close by Baker Bungalow the distance to the island is about 5 km and from Kumarakom 4 km towards northwest.

- Maximum length: 550m (SW to NE)
- Maximum width: 450m (SE to NW)
- Perimeter: 1800 m
- Estimated Area: 19.6 ha
- Distance to the nearest main land: 810m

== History ==
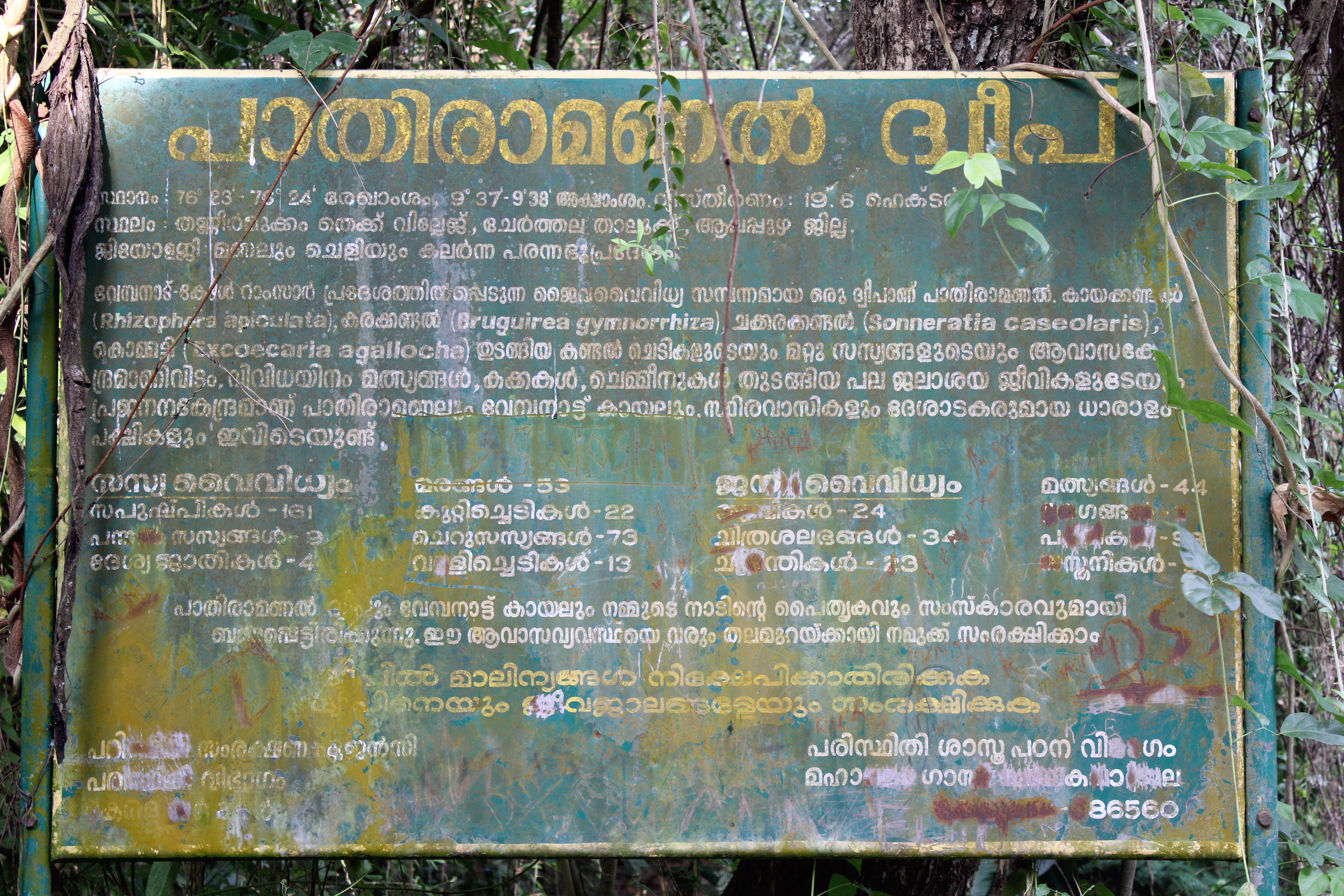
An information board at Pathiramanal island

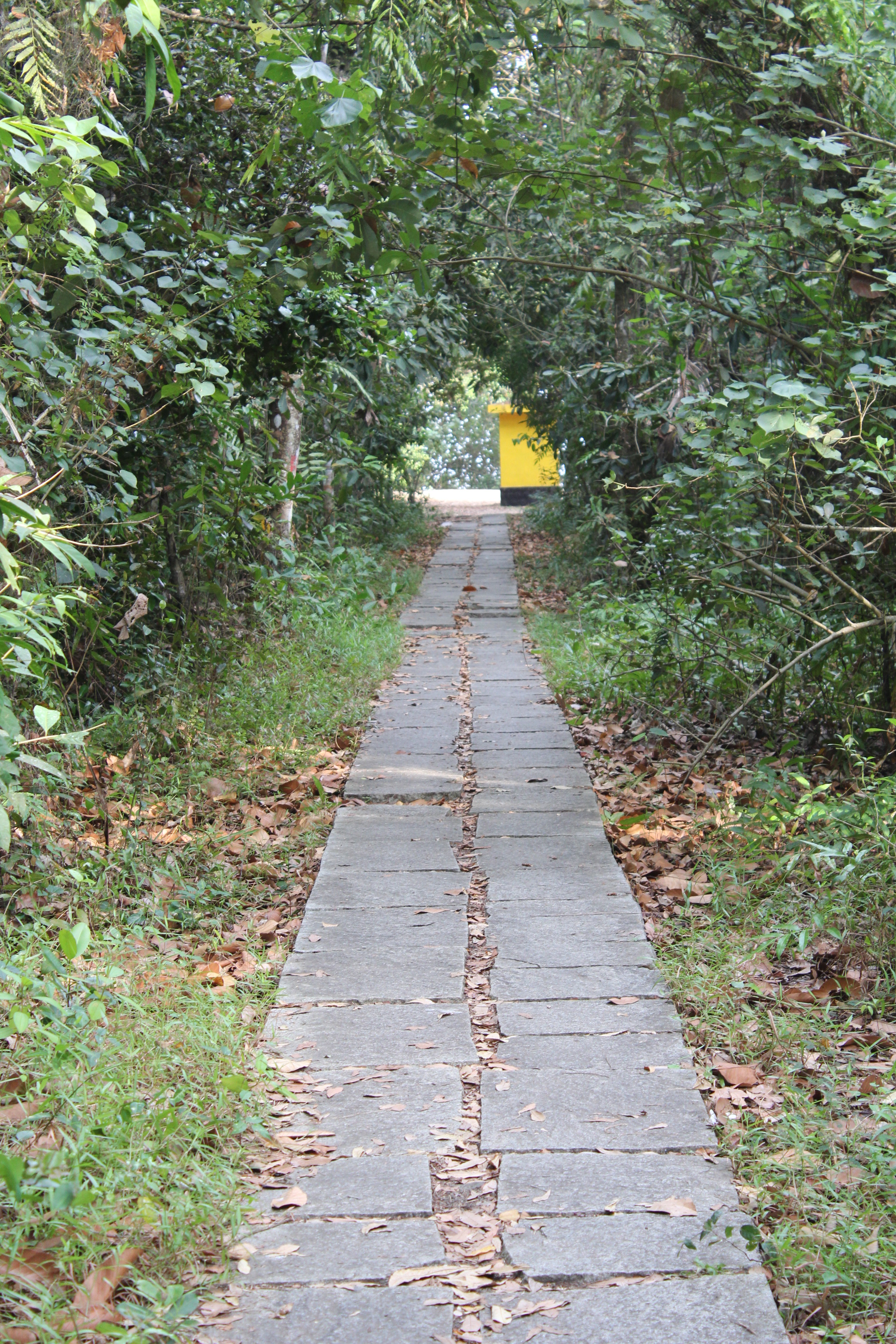
A walkway at Pathiramanal

The island (also known as Anantha Padmanabhan Thoppu) was purchased by Chevalier ACM Anthraper, from M/s Bheemji Devji Trust of Cochin and was under the private ownership of Thaimattathil Family until the late seventies. When Land Reforms Acts were enforced in the State in 1979, the island came under government ownership. The island was returned to the government as a surplus land that crossed the land ceiling. It was later transferred to the Tourism Department and the idea of leasing it out to private enterprises was under consideration. The island at present is uninhabited. Till the late 1970s, 14 worker families resided in the island, who were later rehabilitated on the mainland in the Muhamma panchayath.

== Birdwatching ==
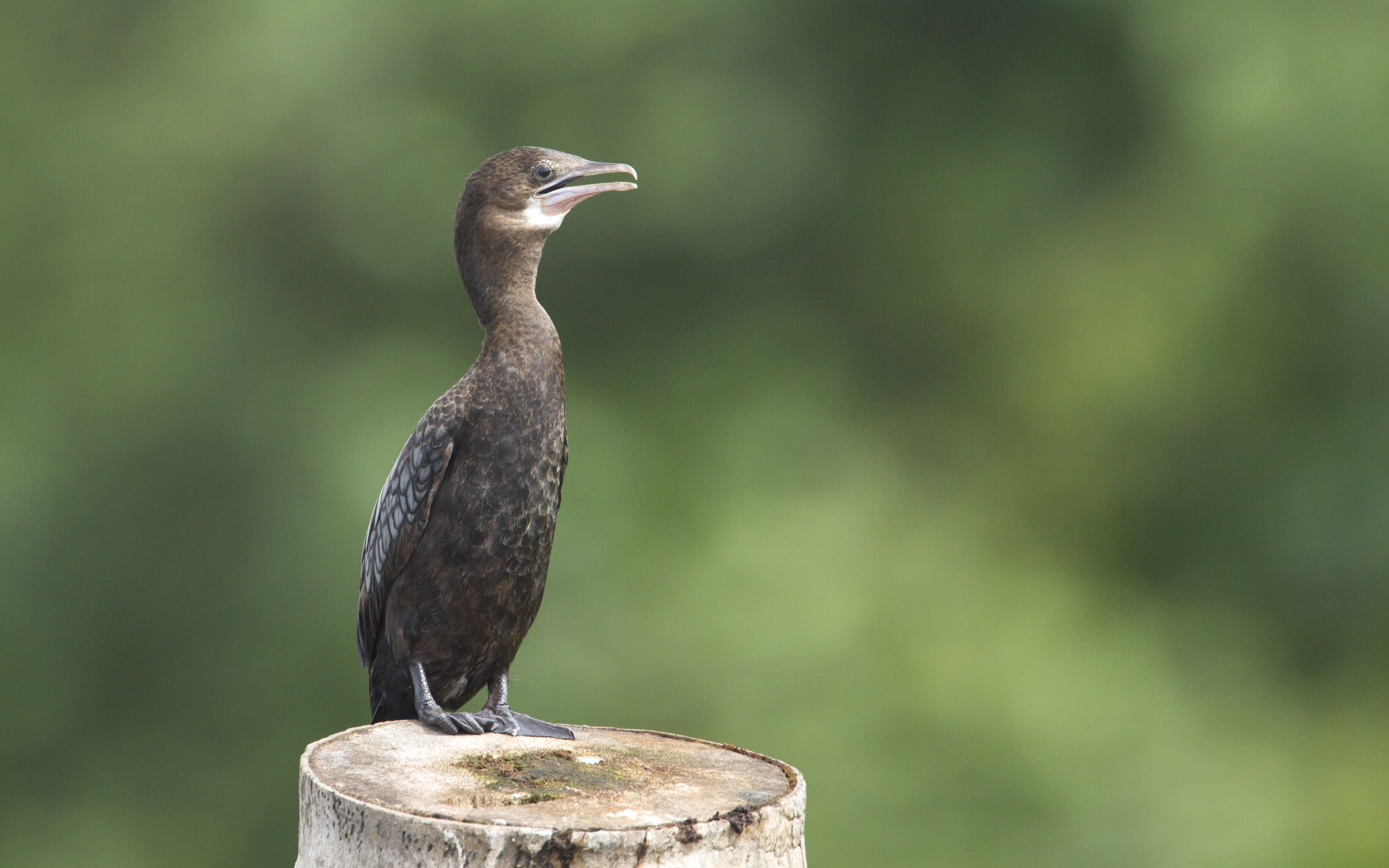
Little cormorant perched at Pathiramanal

The island is home to around 91 local species of birds and 50 migratory birds. One can see pintail ducks, common teal, night heron, cormorant, darter, Indian shag, purple heron, gulls, terns, large egrets, intermediate egret, cattle egret, Indian pond heron, little egret, pheasant-tailed and bronze-winged jacanas, stork-billed kingfisher, watercock, whistling duck, cotton pygmy-goose, little cormorant and whiskered tern. Some people have even reported seeing the monarch flycatcher.

== See also ==
- Kakkathuruth
