= Kumarakom Bird Sanctuary =

Kumarakom Bird Sanctuary കുമരകം പക്ഷി സങ്കേതം
- National park
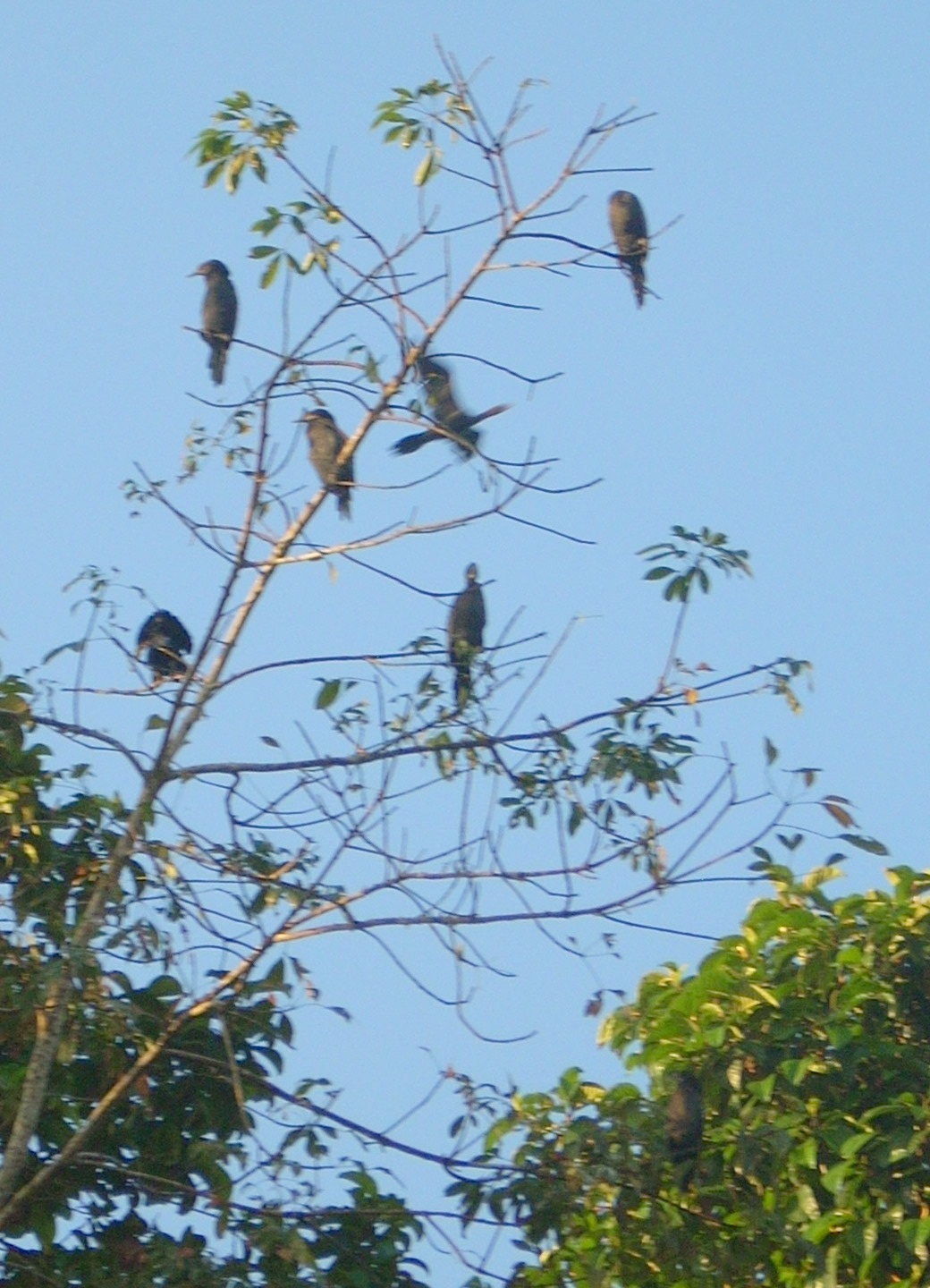

- Location in Kerala, India Kumarakom Bird Sanctuary കുമരകം പക്ഷി സങ്കേതം (India)
- Coordinates: 9.5°N 76.52°E
- Country: India
- State: Kerala
- District: Kottayam
- Elevation: 0 m (0 ft)

Languages
  - Official: Malayalam, English
- Time zone: UTC+5:30 (IST)
- ISO 3166 code: IN-KL
- Vehicle registration: KL-05, KL-36
- Nearest city: Kottayam
- Avg. summer temperature: 34 °C (93 °F)
- Avg. winter temperature: 22 °C (72 °F)

Kumarakom Bird Sanctuary (also known as Vembanad Bird Sanctuary) is situated at Kumarakom in Kottayam taluk of Kottayam district in the Indian state of Kerala, on the banks of Vembanad Lake. Set in the Kerala Backwaters, the bird sanctuary is visited by many migratory bird species.

== History ==
Developed in a rubber plantation as a bird sanctuary by Englishman George Alfred Baker, the sanctuary was formerly known as Baker's Estate. The Kerala Tourism Development Corporation currently manages the sanctuary.

== Geography ==
The sanctuary is spread over 14 acres (5.7 ha) on the southern bank of the Meenachil River River.

Kumarakom is 14 kilometres (8.7 mi) from Kottayam. State Highway No. 1 leads to Kochi and Thiruvananthapuram in opposite directions. Kochi International Airport at Nedumbassery is 106 km (66 mi) from Kumarakom.

Neighbouring areas such as Kaipuzha Muttu, Pathirmanal, Narakathara, Thollairam Kayal, and Poothanpandi Kayal are also good locations for spotting birds.

== Fauna ==
The main attractions are local birds like waterfowl, koel, owl, egret, heron, cormorant, moorhen, darter, and brahminy kite, as well as the migratory teal, gull, tern, flycatcher, and other birds are seen here during their respective migratory seasons. Some of the migratory birds come from the Himalayas, and a few from Siberia.

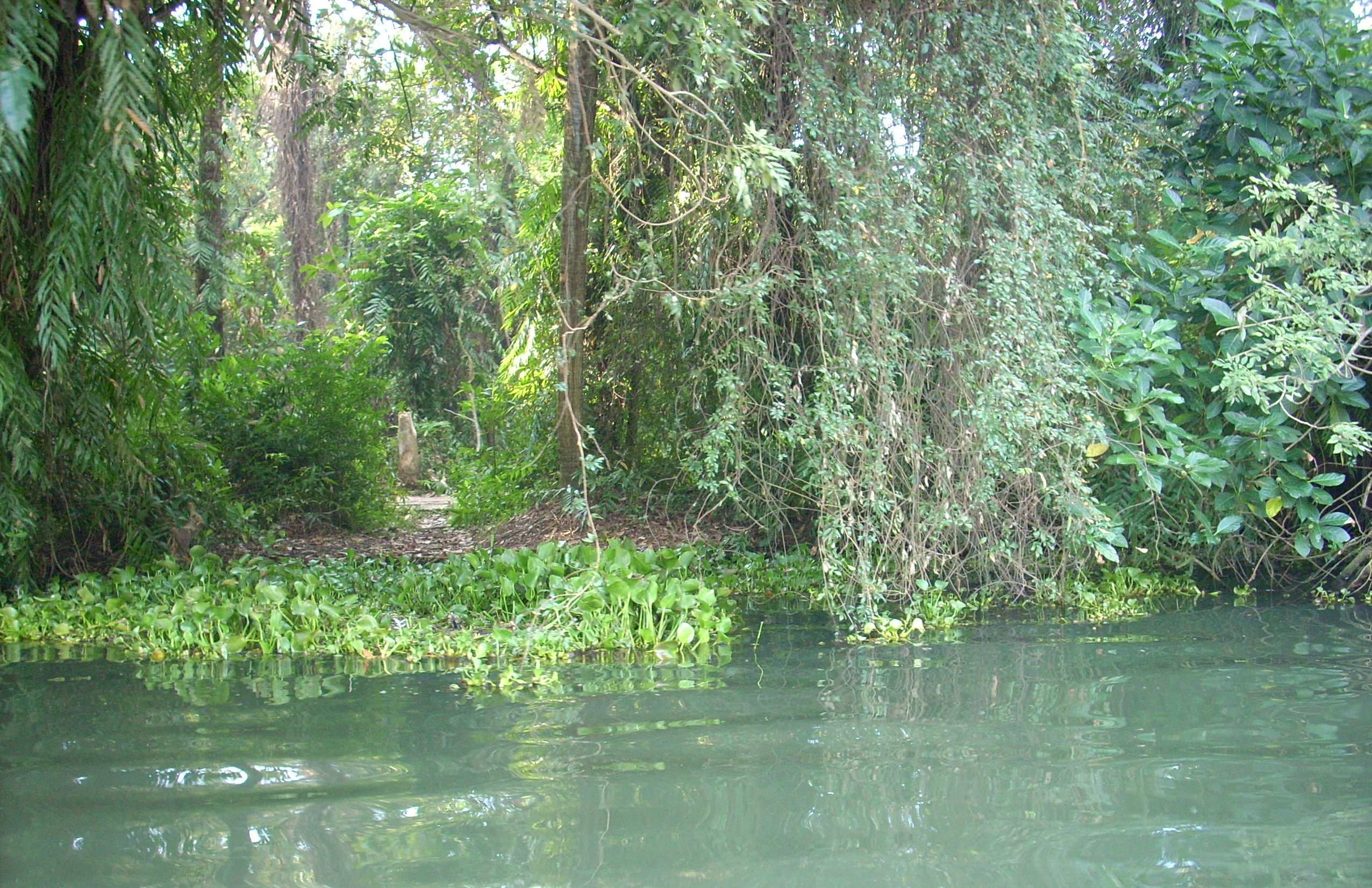
Sanctuary from Kavanar River

In 2008, WWF-India organised a two-day bird watching programme at the sanctuary in connection with World Wetlands Day.
