= Perumbalam =

Perumbalam Primbalão
- Village
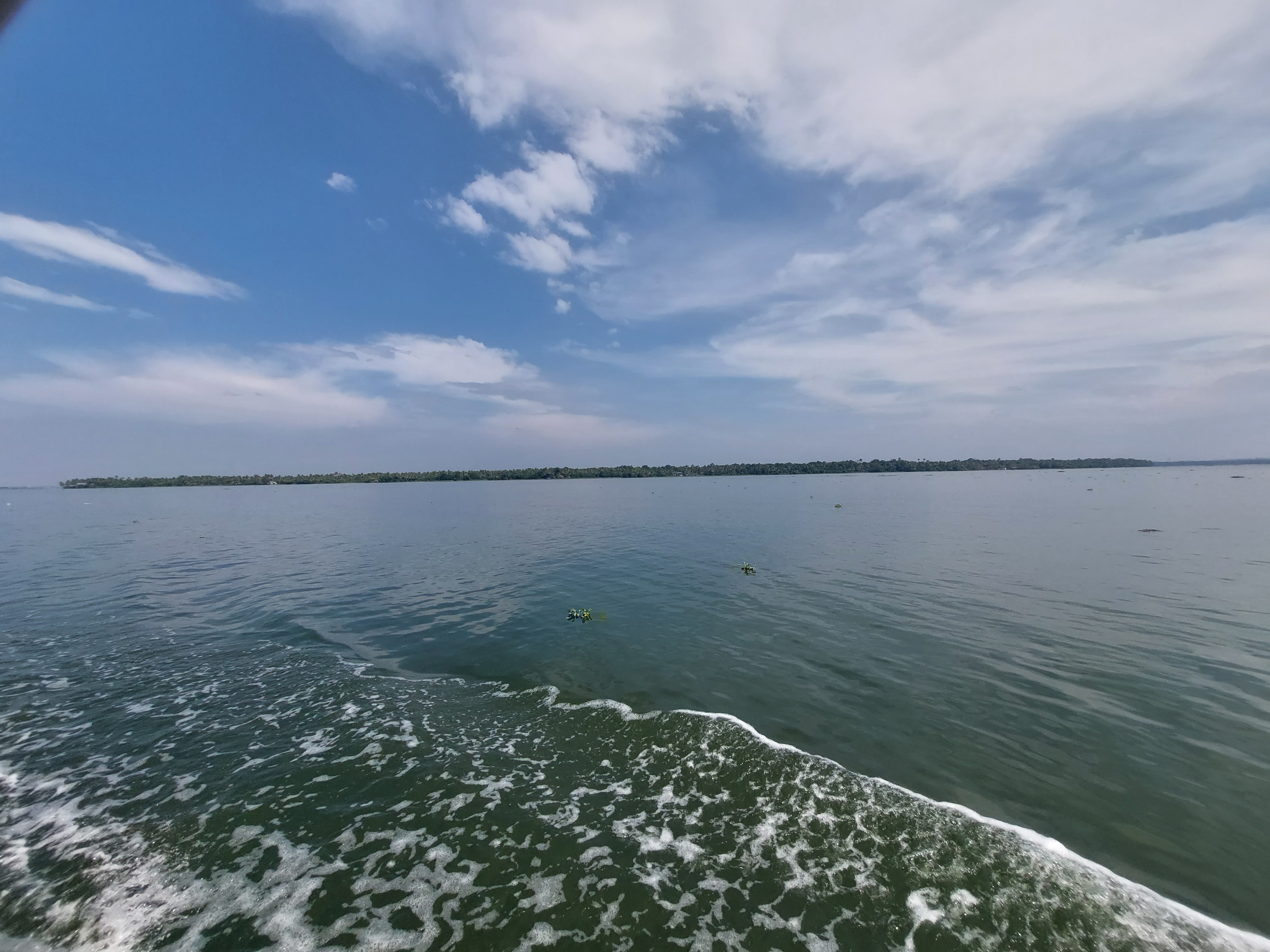
- Perumbalam island in 2023

- Location in Kerala, India Perumbalam (India)
- Coordinates: 9°51′N 76°22′E
- Country: India
- State: Kerala
- District: Alappuzha

Population (2011)
  - Total: 9,733

Languages
  - Official: Malayalam,
- Time zone: UTC+5:30 (IST)
- PIN: 688570
- Lok Sabha constituency: Alappuzha
- Niyamasabha constituency: Aroor

Perumbalam is an island village in the Alappuzha district in the Indian state of Kerala. As of 2001 India census, Perumbalam had a population of 9,733 with 4,880 males and 4,853 females. The village is situated upon an island in Vembanad Lake. The island has a total land area of 6 square kilometers. It lies 600 meters to the west of the Ernakulam district of Kerala. It is connected to the mainland on the Alappuzha side by the Perumbalam Bridge, which is over 1.1 km long.

== See also ==
- Battle of Cochin (1504)
