= Kakkathuruth =

Island in Kerala, India

- island
- Location in Kerala, India Kakkathuruth (India)
- Coordinates: 9.817°N 76.325°E
- Country: India
- State: Kerala
- District: Alappuzha

Government
  - Body: Gram panchayat

Languages
  - Official: Malayalam, English
- Time zone: UTC+5:30 (IST)

Kakkathuruth is a tiny island located at the Alappuzha district in the Indian state of Kerala surrounded by the Vembanatu Lake. Known as the Island of crows, the National Geographic described the sunset seen from Kakkathuruthu as the best in the world. It was included in the National Geographic series of 24 most beautiful pictures of different regions of the planet.

Kakkathuruth

== Overview ==
Kakathuruth is located in Ezhupunna village at the northern end of Alappuzha. Eramallur is the land closest to Kakkathurth located one kilometer from the island. The island can be accessed using boat from Eramallur. About 300 families live in the island, which is only three kilometers long and one and a half kilometers wide. Situated in the middle of the Vembanatu lake, Kakkathuruth is a haven for crows and many other birds making it a favorite spot for bird watchers.

There are no major roads in the island and bicycles are the main vehicle on dirt roads. There is an Anganwadi (school for kids) and Ayurveda hospital in the island. The combination of mangroves, swamps, coconut groves that can be seen everywhere and the vastness of the Vembanatu backwater has made Kakathuruth a major tourist spot in Alappuzha. In 2016, National Geographic selected Kakathuruth as one of the 24 most beautiful places in the world.

== See also ==
- Kerala backwaters
