= Vembanad =

Lake in Kerala, India

Vembanad Lake
- വേമ്പനാട്ട് കായല്‍ (Malayalam)
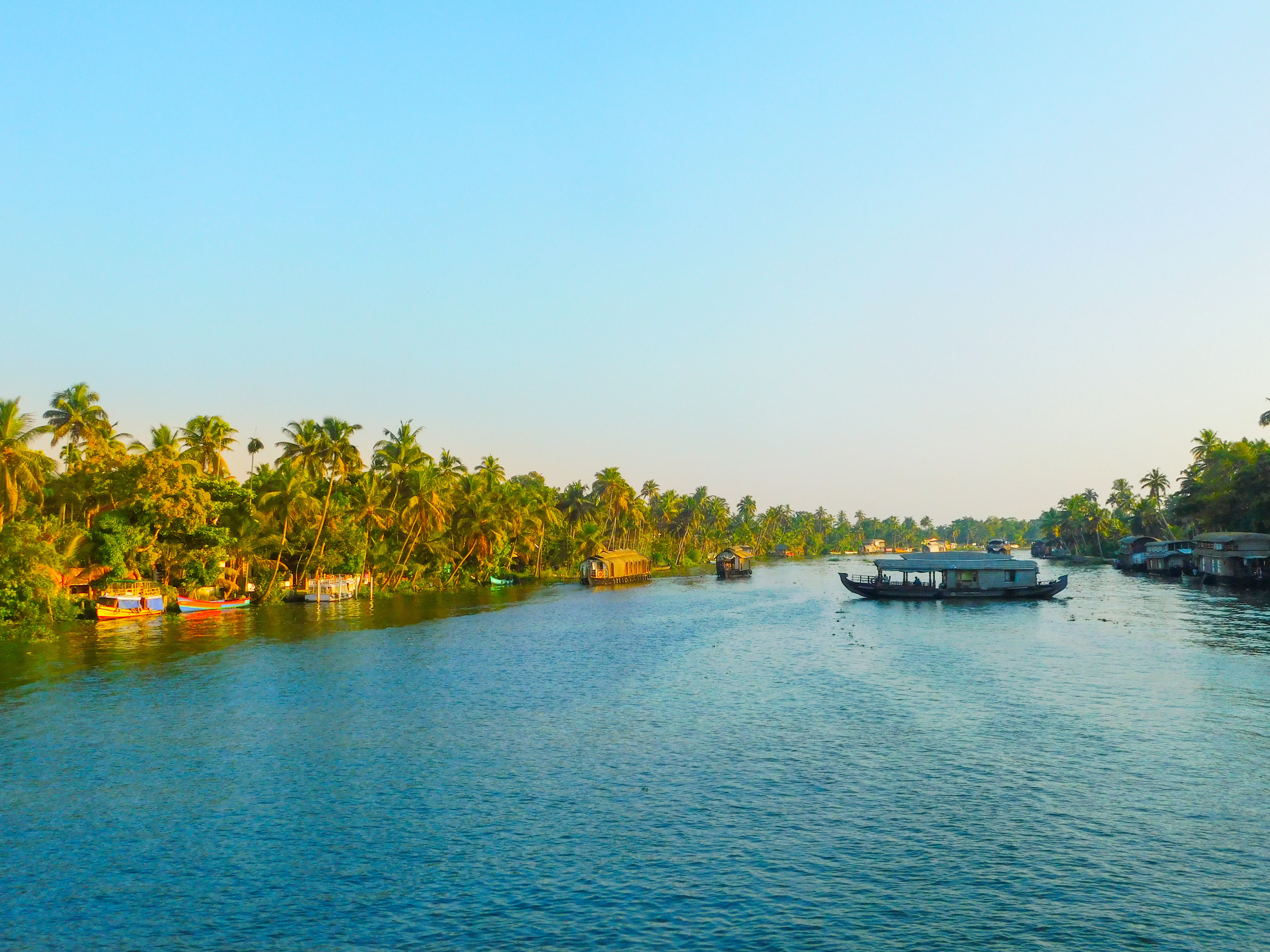
- Vembanad Lake

- Location within Kerala
- Coordinates: 9°51′N 76°21′E
- Primary inflows: Achenkovil, Manimala, Meenachil, Muvattupuzha, Pamba, Periyar
- Primary outflows: several canals
- Basin countries: India
- First flooded: 1341 (likely)
- Max. length: 96.5 km (60.0 mi)
- Max. width: 14 km (8.7 mi)
- Surface area: 2,033 km^{2} (785 sq mi)
- Max. depth: 12 m (39 ft)
- Surface elevation: 0 m (0 ft)
- Islands: Pathiramanal, Perumbalam, Pallippuram, Kumbalangi
- Settlements: Kottayam, Alleppey, Cochin, Cherthala

Ramsar Wetland
- Official name: Vembanad-Kol Wetland
- Designated: 19 August 2002

Vembanad (Malayalam: [ʋeːmbɐnaːɖə̆]) is the longest lake in India, and the largest in the state of Kerala. The lake has an area of 2,033 square kilometres (785 sq mi) and a maximum length of 96.5 km (60 mi).

Spanning three districts in the state of Kerala, it is known as Vembanad Lake in Kottayam, Vaikom, Changanassery, Punnamada Lake in Alappuzha, Punnappra, Kuttanadu and Kochi Lake in Kochi. Several groups of small islands including Vypin, Mulavukad, Maradu, Udayamperoor, Vallarpadam, and Willingdon Island are located in the Kochi Lake portion. Kochi Port is built around Willingdon Island and Vallarpadam island.

Kuttanad, also known as The Rice Bowl of Kerala, has the lowest altitude in India, and is also one of the few places in the world where cultivation takes place below sea level. Kuttanad lies on the southern portion of Vembanad. The Nehru Trophy Boat Race is conducted in a portion of the lake. High levels of pollution have been noticed at certain hotspots of the Vembanad backwaters. The Government of India has identified the Vembanad wetland under the National Wetlands Conservation Programme.

== Geography and hydrography ==
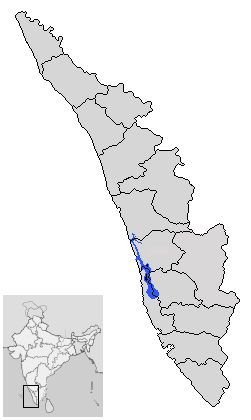
Location in Kerala

Vembanad Lake is 96.5 km (60 mi) long, making it the longest lake in India. The Vembanad wetland system covers an area of over 2,033.02 km^{2} (784.95 sq mi), thereby making it the largest wetland system in India. Of this, an area of 398.12 km^{2} (153.71 sq mi) is located below the mean sea level (MSL), and a total area of 763.23 km^{2} (294.68 sq mi) is located below 1 metre (3 ft 3 in) MSL. The lake is bordered by Alappuzha, Kottayam, and Ernakulam districts. It is situated at sea level and is separated from the Laccadive Sea by a narrow barrier island. Canals link the lake to other coastal lakes in the north and south. The lake surrounds the islands of Pathiramanal, Perumbalam and Pallippuram. Vembanad Lake is approximately 14 km (8.7 mi) wide at its widest point.

The lake is a part of the Vembanad-Kol wetland system which extends from Alappuzha in the south to Azheekkode in the north, making it by far India's longest lake at just over 96.5 km (60 mi) in length. The lake is fed by 10 rivers flowing into it including the six major rivers of central Kerala namely the Achenkovil, Manimala River, Meenachil River, Muvattupuzha River, Pamba River and Periyar River. The total area drained by the lake is 15,770 km^{2} (6,090 sq mi), which accounts for 40% of the area of Kerala. Its annual surface runoff of 21,900 mm (860 in) accounts for almost 30% of the total surface water resource of the state.

The most popular location on the shores of the lake is the Kumarakom Tourist Village situated on the east coast of the lake. The Kumarakom Bird Sanctuary is located on the northern fringes of Kumarakom village. The Vembanad Wetland system was included in the list of wetlands of international importance, as defined by the Ramsar Convention for the conservation and sustainable utilization of wetlands in 2002. It is the largest of the three Ramsar Sites in the state of Kerala. Vembanad Lake has been heavily reclaimed over the course of the past century, with the water spread area reducing from 290.85 km^{2} (112.30 sq mi) in 1917 to 227 km^{2} (88 sq mi) in 1971 and 213.28 km^{2} (82.35 sq mi) in 1990. In the same period, almost 63.62 km^{2} (24.56 sq mi) of erstwhile water spread was reclaimed primarily for the formation of polders and to enlarge the extent of Willingdon Island in Cochin port. The lake faces a major ecological crisis and has reduced to 37 percent of its original area as a result of land reclamation.

A unique characteristic of the lake is the 1,252 metres (4,108 ft)-long Thanneermukkom salt water barrier constructed as a part of the Kuttanad Development Scheme to prevent tidal action and intrusion of salt water into the Kuttanad lowlands. It is the largest mud regulator in India and essentially divides the lake into two parts – one with perennial brackish water and the other with fresh water from rivers draining into the lake. This barrier has helped farmers in Kuttanad by freeing the area of salinity and allowing them an additional crop in the dry season.

The Thanneermukkom barrier is located at one of the narrower parts of Vembanad Lake. Only two-thirds of the original number of gates are opened in July to release flood flow. These gates remain closed until mid-November. The main drawback of the structure has been the loss of opportunity for fish and prawns to migrate upstream, and also an increase in weed growth in the upstream, severely restricting the natural flushing of pollutants. The Thanneermukkom bund has created ecological problems, primarily the rampant propagation of the water hyacinth in fresh water.

== Tourism ==
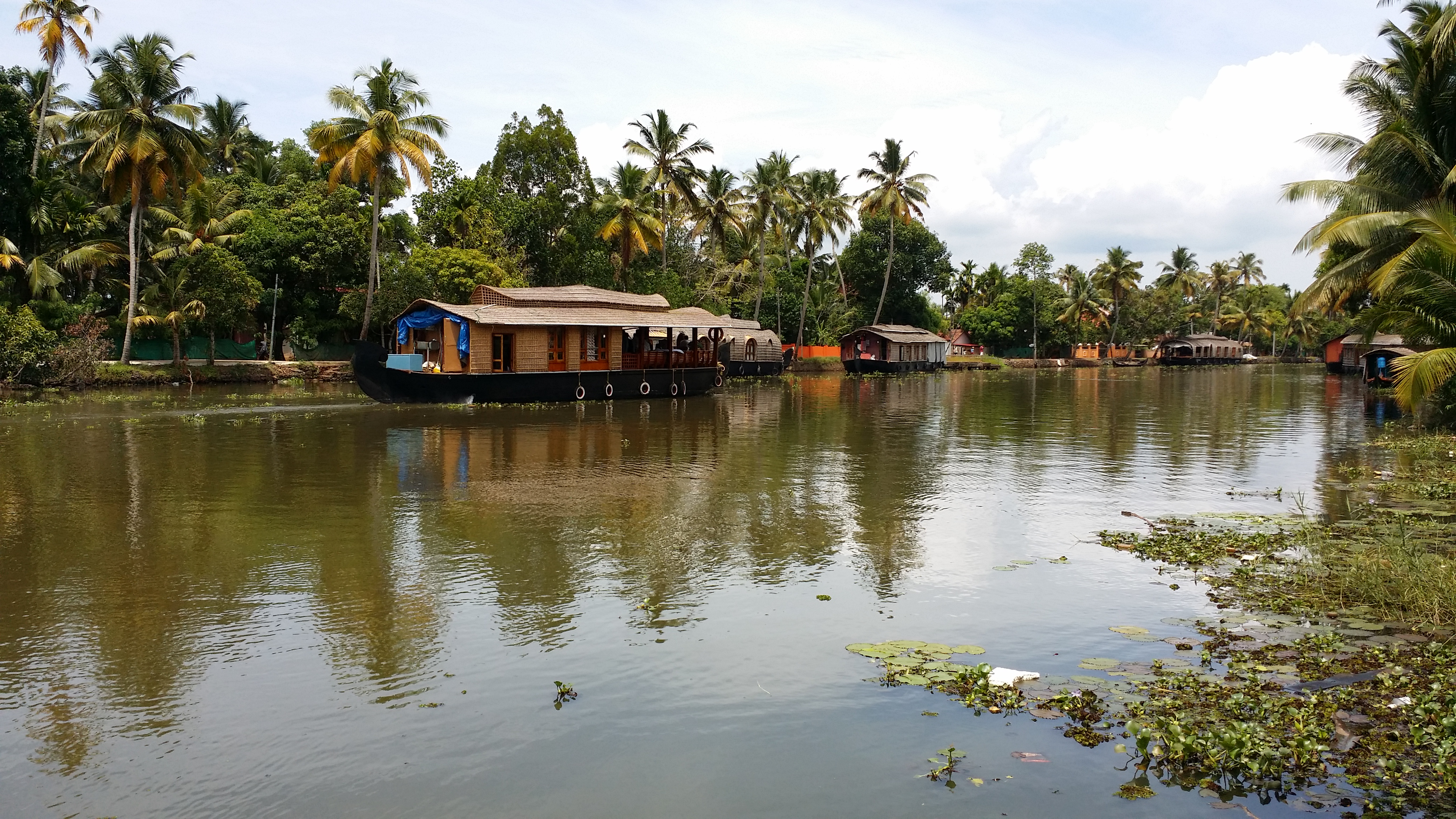
Houseboat on Vembanad Lake

The lake has become a major tourist attraction. A generally safe destination, this place had just one incident of tourist harassment in 2004 as reported in The Times of India.

=== Houseboats ===
Vembanad Lake is at the heart of Kerala Backwaters tourism with hundreds of houseboats (kettuvallams in Malayalam) plied on it and numerous resorts on its banks.

=== Bird sanctuary ===
The Kumarakom Bird Sanctuary is located on the east coast of the lake.

=== Boat races ===
During the months of August and September, the rivers in and near Kottayam become centres of activity and attraction due to these boat races, a Kerala tradition. Snake boat races—the lakes and rivers come alive during Onam with this water sport.

=== Lake islands ===
The lake has a small island called Pathiramanal, which can be accessed only via a boat. Another major attraction is the island of Kakkathuruth.

== Inland transport ==
The Vembanad Wetland system has formed an intricate network of estuaries, lagoons and canals that spans over 196 km (122 mi) in the north–south and 29 km (18 mi) in the east–west directions. Almost all villages in these areas can be accessed via water transport. The Muvattupuzha, Meenachil, Pamba and Achencovil rivers are all navigable up to distances of about 30 km (19 mi) upstream in the tidal reach. The Kottappuram–Kollam segment of the west coast canal system has a major chunk passing through Vembanad Lake and spans a total of 209 km (130 mi). It has been declared a National Waterway.

== Ecological importance ==
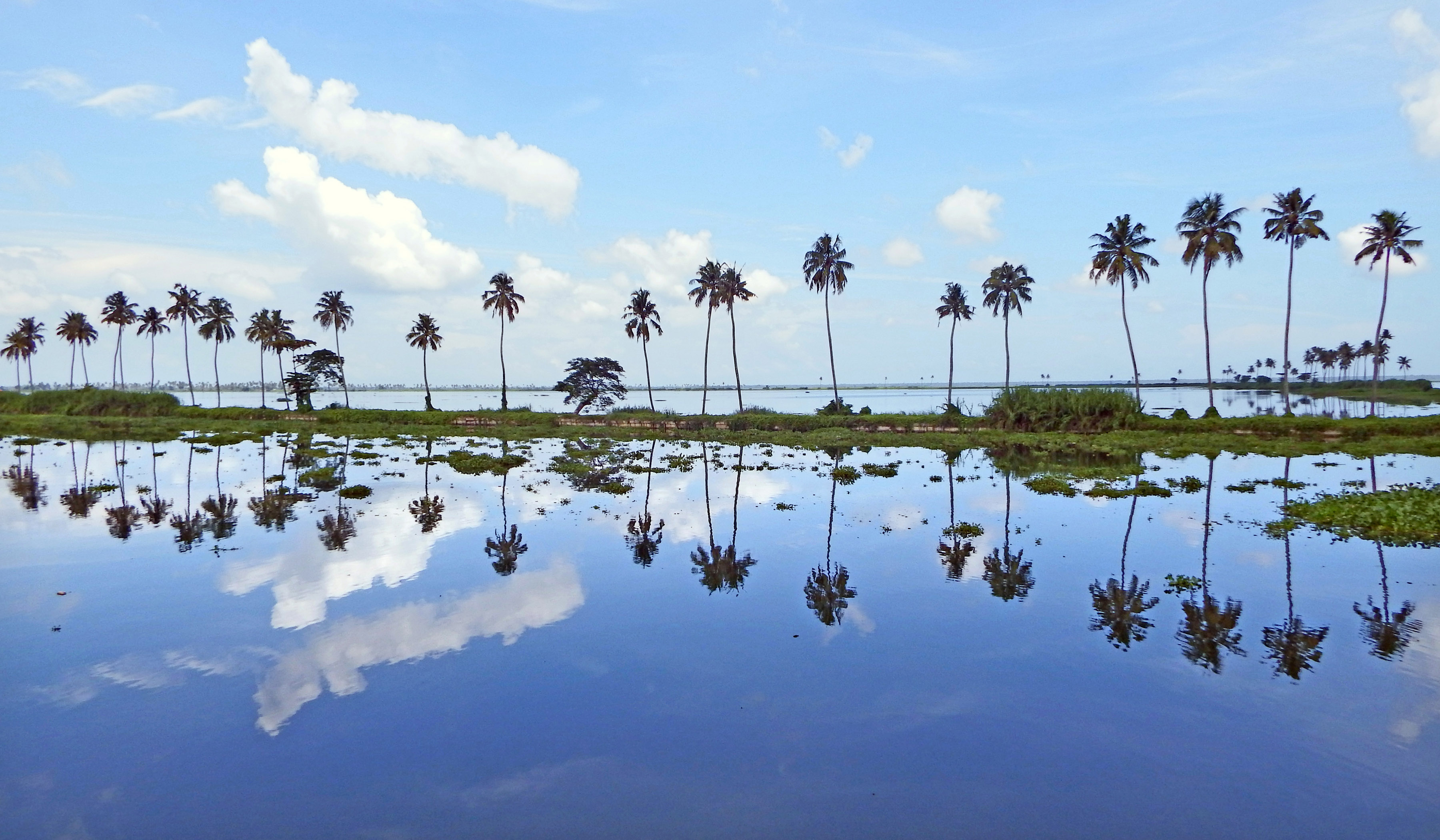
Vembanad Lake at Kumarakom

Vembanad Kol Wetland was included in the list of wetlands of international importance, as defined by the Ramsar Convention for the conservation and sustainable utilization of wetlands. It is home to more than 20,000 waterfowl – the third largest such population in India. It is also an ideal habitat for shrimp.

== See also ==
- Alappuzha district
- Kottayam district
- Pathanamthitta district
- Ernakulam district
- Ashtamudi Lake
