= Portuguese expedition to Sofala (1505) =

The 1505 expedition of Pêro de Anaia to Sofala led to the establishment of Fort São Caetano, the first permanent Portuguese colony in East Africa. The Capitaincy of Sofala would eventually evolve into the colonial government of Portuguese Mozambique.

Although they did not ultimately sail together, Pêro de Anaia's expedition is usually regarded as a squadron of the 7th Portuguese India Armada of D. Francisco de Almeida that left Lisbon a little earlier in 1505 for the Indian Ocean.

== Prelude ==
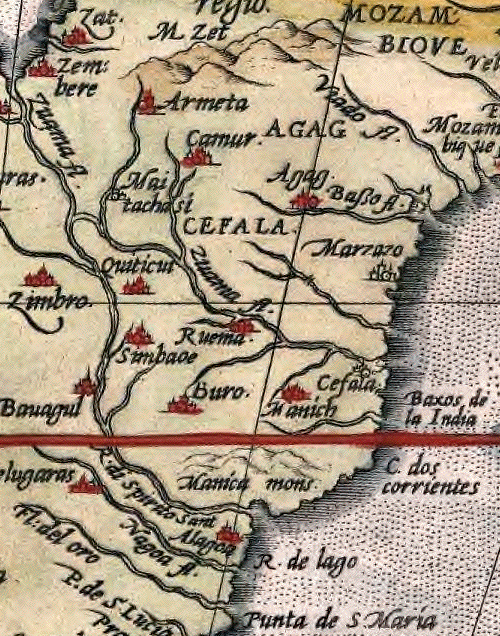
Sofala ("Cefala") from the atlas "Africae Tabula Nova", of Abraham Ortelius (Antwerp, 1570).

Sofala was one of several Muslim Swahili commercial city-states in East Africa under the sway of the Kilwa Sultanate. Around 1489, Sofala had been visited by the Portuguese spy Pêro da Covilhã, who identified it as the principal emporium for the gold trade with the interior kingdom of Monomatapa. The Portuguese crown had been eager to tap into that gold source, and made it a priority for its early Portuguese India Armadas to find the city.

In 1498, Vasco da Gama visited several cities along the Swahili Coast, but did not find Sofala. In 1501, captain Sancho de Tovar located the city from the sea, but did not go ashore. Finally, in 1502, Vasco da Gama returned to the area with a new fleet, and, while idling on Mozambique Island, dispatched a detachment of boats under Pedro Afonso de Aguiar to visit Sofala.

Arriving at the city, Pedro Afonso de Aguiar sought out an audience with the blind octogenarian sheikh Isuf of Sofala (Yçuf in Barros Çufe in Goes), whom he took to be the ruler of Sofala. In fact, Isuf's authority was ambiguous. Formally, Sofala still belonged to the inland Bantu kingdom of the Monomatapa, and sheikh Isuf was merely the leader of the Swahili community in the city, who paid tribute to Monomatapa for permission to reside and trade there. The community itself was under the legal supervision of the Kilwa Sultanate, and Isuf was originally an appointee of the Sultan of Kilwa. Sheikh Isuf was more of a Kilwan consul than a ruler.

Nonetheless, since the usurpation by Emir Muhammad in Kilwa back in 1495, sheikh Isuf had been charting an independent course for his community in Sofala. The Portuguese, with their powerful ships, seemed to offer the key to shaking off Kilwa's authority. At any rate, the elderly sheikh Isuf realized it would be better to make allies rather than enemies out of the Portuguese, and so agreed to Aguiar's proposals and signed a treaty of commercial and political alliance with the Kingdom of Portugal.

Nothing much came of this initial contact. Vasco da Gama's 4th Armada was eager to move on, and did not even wait for Aguiar to return with the news. Gama established a small Portuguese factory on Mozambique Island, under Gonçalo Baixo, to deal with whatever came out of the Sofala-related business, and just sailed on. Aguiar, hurrying to catch up with them, had to drop off the Sofalese ambassador he was bringing and tell him to find his own way back home.

== Anaia's 1505 expedition ==
After the 4th Armada returned to Lisbon, with news of the Sofalese treaty, preparations immediately began to equip an expedition to erect a Portuguese factory and fortress in Sofala. King Manuel I of Portugal placed Pêro de Anaia in charge of this. Anaia was assigned command of a ship, the Sant'Iago (or Nuncia), which was to sail out in 1505 as part of the 7th Armada led by D. Francisco de Almeida.

But in March 1505, as the 7th Armada sailed out of Lisbon harbor, Anaia's ship sprung a leak and capsized in the Tagus estuary. Efforts to recover the ship came to naught, and Anaia was forced to return to land, while the 7th Armada sailed on.

But the Sofala mission was too important to postpone, so a new six-ship fleet was quickly assembled, and ready to sail out a little over a month later. Although it never caught up with Almeida's 7th Armada, it can be still be considered part of that year's armada.

== Fleet ==
Pêro de Anaia's Sofala-bound fleet was composed of three large naus (carracks) and three smaller ships, probably caravels. The following list of ships and captains should not be regarded as authoritative. It is a tentative list compiled from various conflicting accounts:

Ship Name	Captain	Notes
Naus
1. uncertain	Pêro de Anaia	flagship, captain of Sofala ship passed at Sofala to Gonçalo Álvares; then at Malindi to Paio Rodrigues de Sousa.
2. Espírito Santo	Pero Barreto de Magalhães	400t, found remnant of Lopo Sanchez's crew near Quelimane. Later ran aground at Kilwa banks.
3. Santo António	João Leite of Santarém	Leite fell overboard near Sierra Leone, passed to Jorge Mendes Çacoto, ship passed at Sofala to João Vaz de Almada; then at Malindi to Pedro Barreto de Magalhães.
Caravels
4. São João	Francisco de Anaia	son of Pêro de Anaia. Designated captain for local Sofala patrol. Lost caravel off Mozambique.
5. unknown	Manuel Fernandes de Meireles (or Pedro Cão)	Designated factor of Sofala. Ship passed at Sofala to Jorge Mendes Çacoto.
6. São Paulo	João de Queirós	Queirós killed in South Africa, passed to João Vaz de Almada, ship passed at Sofala to Pêro Teixeira, and then lost near Mozambique.

[Because the name of Anaia's flagship is conspicuously missing, some writers sometimes mistakenly call it the Espirito Santo (confusing it with Magalhães's). Because there were so many captain changes along the way, chronicles also frequently fall into confusion themselves. The reconciliation given above is principally due to Castanheda. Finally, as usual, chronicler Gaspar Correia tends to deviate from the rest: Correia is the only one to suggest that 'Pedro Cão' was the original designated factor, and only he supplies the surnames 'de Meireles' and 'Çacoto' to those whom everybody else just calls 'Manuel Fernandes' and 'Jorge Mendes' respectively.]

The instructions given by King Manuel I of Portugal were straightforward. They were to erect a factory and fortress in Sofala. Pêro de Anaia would go as captain-major of the fleet, and carried a commission to become captain-major of the Sofala fortress, Manuel Fernandes de Meireles was to serve as commercial factor.

After the fort was built, Anaia was to dispatch four ships - the three large naus and one caravel - under the overall command of Pero Barreto de Magalhães to Cochin, India, where viceroy Almeida would ensure they would load up with spices and be sent back to Lisbon. The remaining caravels would serve as a coastal patrol around Sofala under the command of Anaia's son, Francisco de Anaia, who carried a royal commission appointing him capitão-mor do mar de Sofala (captain-major of the sea of Sofala).

== Outward journey ==
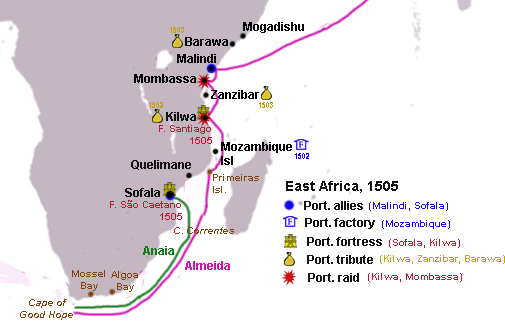
Route of 7th Armada in Africa in 1505; purple = main fleet of D. Francisco de Almeida; green = squadron of Pêro de Anaia

May 18, 1505 – Pêro de Anaia's six-ship fleet sets out of Lisbon harbor, destined for Sofala.

August, 1505 - Anaia's squadron doubles the Cape of Good Hope with some difficulty. It is said that Anaia plotted a very wide route around the Cape, far south into freezing temperatures, speculated as far as 45° South. It is reported that several crew members died from the cold. The fleet splits up during the crossing. Anaia manages to keep two ships with him.

September 4, 1505 - Pêro de Anaia, his son Francisco de Anaia and the factor Manuel Fernandes finally reach Sofala harbor, and await the other three ships. They gradually arrive, each with their own tale of woe:

- The nau Santo António arrives in Sofala without its captain, João Leite having fallen overboard while fishing near Sierra Leone and drowned; the crew had elected Jorge Mendes Çacoto to replace him.
- The caravel São Paulo arrives without any officers at all; the caravel had made a watering stop in a South African bay where plenty of cattle was sighted (variously speculated to be Flesh Bay or Algoa Bay), quarrelled with the Khoikhoi natives, who ended up killing not only the captain, João de Queirós, but also the pilots, master and other officers, leaving no one able to navigate the ship. The only surviving officer was the clerk Antão de Gá, who had absolutely no navigational knowledge. Only by luck did they spot the Santo António of Jorge Mendes, who lent them his master João Vaz de Almada to guide them to Sofala.
- The nau Espírito Santo, under Pero_Barreto_de_Magalhães, anchors at Cape St. Sebastian, the Portuguese pilot too wary about approaching the Sofala banks. A launch is dispatched under Barreto's brother, António de Magalhães, to find a local pilot or fetch one from Anaia. The launch is directed by locals to the environs of Quelimane, where, by the shores of the Rio Cuama (Zambezi River) Magalhães finds five famished Portuguese sailors - the half-dead survivors of Lopo Sanchez's caravel (see 7th Armada). Anaia dispatches a pilot (Almada again apparently) to fetch Barreto's ship and guide it through the shoals of Sofala harbor.

== Fort São Caetano ==
Early September 1505 - After gathering his scattered ships, Pêro de Anaia requests an audience with the sheikh Isuf of Sofala. As noted earlier, sheikh Isuf had agreed to a commercial treaty back in 1502, but the city itself belongs to the Monomatapa. What Pêro de Anaia was now proposing - the establishment of a permanent Portuguese factory and fort in the city – probably exceeds Isuf's authority to allow. Nonetheless, the recent news of Almeida's attacks on Kilwa and Mombasa persuade sheikh Isuf that a similar fate might await Sofala if he shows any sign of legal quibbling or recalcitrance. So a new deal is struck and Isuf 'allows' the Portuguese to establish a factory and a fort. As a sign of goodwill, Isuf hands over to Anaia another twenty Portuguese survivors of the Lopo Sanchez caravel that had he had collected.

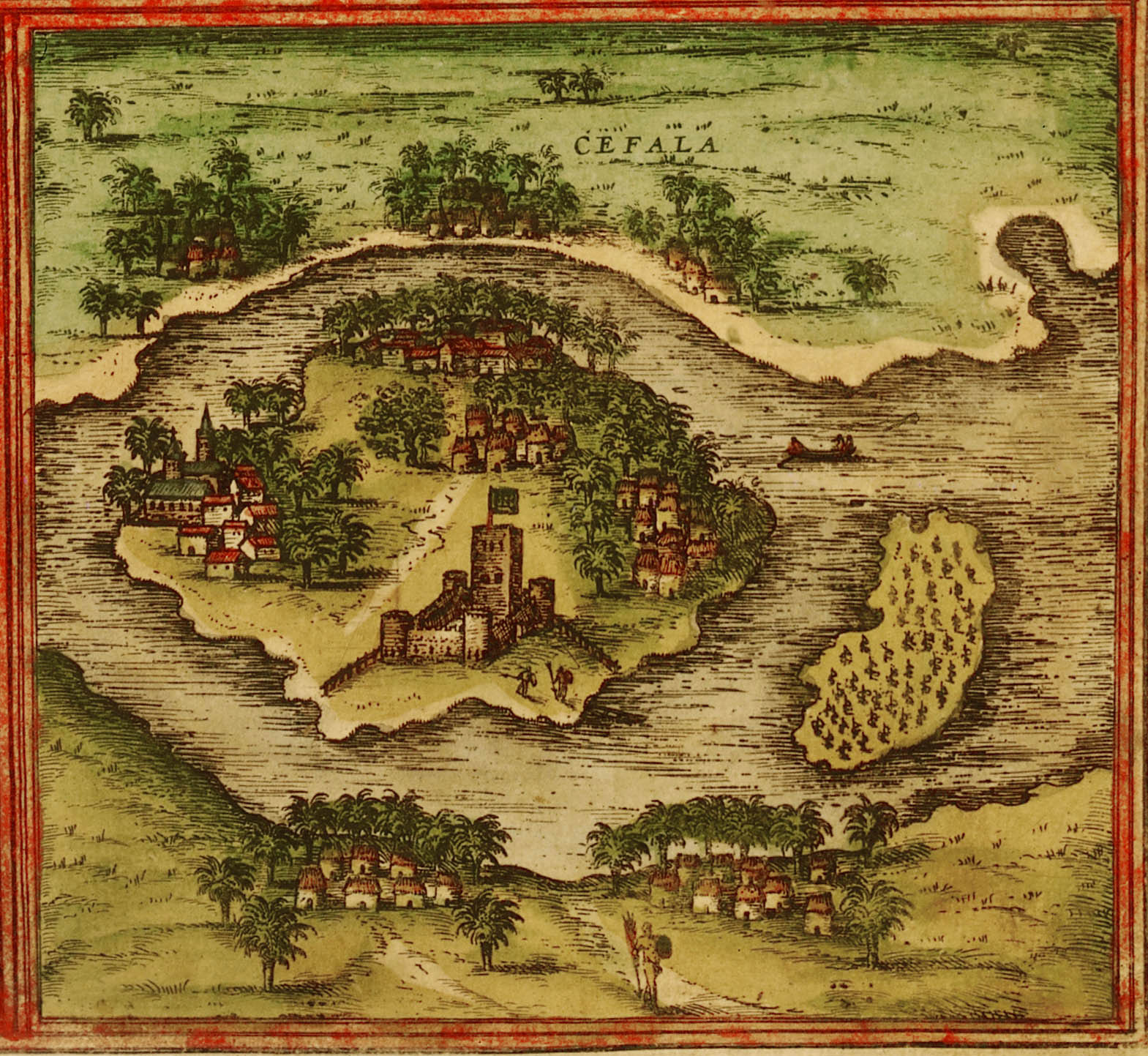
City of Sofala (Cefala), c. 1572, with Fort São Caetano visible

September 25, 1505 - Construction begins on the Portuguese Fort São Caetano of Sofala. Anaia begins with the erection of a wooden palisade on a square plan, with each side measured at 120 paces. A moat is dug around it, of 12 palms depth and 12 palms width. He then erects the main wall within the moat, and then another perimeter wall outside of it. The surrounding area is cleared of vegetation to allow a clear line of fire. Much of the labor for the fort construction is procured locally, although every crewman, including the nobles and Anaia himself, were expected to participate in manual labor.

November 1505 - The fort is essentially finished. At this point, Pêro de Anaia assumes command as 'captain-major' of the Fort of Sofala and Manuel Fernandes de Meireles as factor. As Pêro de Anaia is the first 'Captain of Sofala', he is usually considered the first Portuguese colonial governor of Mozambique.

December 1505 - Factor Manuel Rodrigues's primary concern is trading for gold, ivory and food. But as earlier armadas had already found out, European trade goods do not have much vent in Indian Ocean markets, and Sofala is no exception. Bantu gold, ivory, grain and beef merchants, used to trading with Swahili merchants for quality cotton cloth and exquisite goods from India, are unwilling to pay much for coarse Portuguese wares. More urgently for the fledgling fort, this brings up the concern that the garrison may not be able to procure enough food for its sustenance.

This constraint is slightly alleviated with the appearance at Sofala, in early January 1506, of the Kilwa patrol caravel of Gonçalo Vaz de Goes, with a substantial cargo of Indian trade goods (most of it confiscated from captured Kilwan merchant ships who were 'violating' the new Portuguese mercantilist rules).

== Journey of Sofala naus to India ==
In January 1506, as per his instructions, captain Pêro de Anaia prepares the fleet of four ships to be dispatched to vice-roy Almeida in India. These are the three large naus, Espírito Santo (under Pedro Barreto de Magalhães), the Santo António (now under João Vaz de Almada) and Anaia's old flagship (now captained by his pilot, Gonçalo Álvares), and the caravel of Manuel Fernandes (now captained by Jorge Mendes Çacoto) As the monsoon season is not yet open for an Indian Ocean crossing, the Sofala naus intend to make their way slowly up the East African coast, escorted by Goes's caravel.

In the meantime, Pêro de Anaia's son, Francisco de Anaia invokes his commission as head of the Sofala coastal patrol (capitão-mor do mar de Sofala) and takes command of the two remaining caravels - the São João ( Francisco de Anaia's own) and São Paulo (now under Pêro Teixeira). Young Anaia immediately sets about cruising the coast, and captures two local Muslim fustas - one loaded with Indian calico, another with ivory - and mercilessly puts their crews to death. But it all ends rather poorly. Navigationally inept, the younger Anaia loses the calico prize and then ends up crashing both his caravels - the first off Mozambique Island, the second at the rocks of São Lazaro banks (Quirimbas Islands). Anaia ends up having to row his way to Kilwa on his remaining captured fusta, arriving there in a sorry shape on March 25, much to the surprise of the Portuguese garrison. He is immediately placed under arrest by the Kilwa governor Pêro Ferreira Fogaça.

In the meantime, the Sofala naus, under the overall command of Pedro Barreto de Magalhães, stop by Mozambique Island, where they find the caravel of Lucas da Fonseca. Fonseca was part of the old Manuel Paçanha squad of the 7th Armada, but had lost his sense of direction and separated from the others the previous summer. He had since been stuck wintering in Africa, waiting for the winds to change to allow him to cross over to India. Barreto de Magalhães annexes Fonseca's caravel into his fleet.

The quintet proceed to Kilwa, where they are surprised to find the young Francisco de Anaia and his crew in jail there. Barreto de Magalhães furiously admonishes young Anaia for losing his caravels, and makes up his mind to carry him to India in chains and put him on trial before the viceroy Almeida.

But Barreto de Magalhães's threats dissolve when he meets an embarrassment of his own. Setting out with his fleet from Kilwa in April 1505, Barreto runs his own ship aground on the sandbanks of Kilwa harbor. Barreto's nau, Espirito Santo, capsizes and is lost, but most of the cargo and crew is saved with the timely assistance of the caravels of Lucas da Fonseca and Jorge Mendes Çacoto. The other two naus, under Almada and Alvares, although noticing the crash, were already outside the sandbank and do not return to help, but just sail on to Malindi by themselves. Young Francisco de Anaia is, naturally, bemused at the turn of events.

Climbing aboard Lucas da Fonseca's caravel (and taking the young Anaia with him), the furious Barreto de Magalhães races up to Malindi and admonishes the two captains, João Vaz de Almada and Gonçalo Alvares, for not helping him back in Kilwa. They protest that their naus were too heavy to risk turning back and running aground into the sandbanks themselves. Their excuses fail to assuage Barreto de Magalhães, who deprives them of their command. He seizes Almada's ship, the Santo António, for himself, and places Álvares's ship (Anaia's old flagship) under the command of his cousin, Paio Rodrigues de Sousa.

In late April/early May 1506 the monsoon winds finally reverse and Barreto de Magalhães leads the four ships across the Indian Ocean. They arrive at Anjediva island in late May. But the strong monsoon winds prevent the larger naus from sailing down the India coast easily. Leaving the three heavier ships anchored in Anjediva, all the captains and as much of the crew as possible pile into Lucas da Fonseca's caravel and cruise down the coast to Cochin to present themselves to viceroy Francisco de Almeida. In light of the events in Kilwa, Barreto de Magalhães refrains from lodging official charges against young Francisco de Anaia.

== Assault on the Fort ==
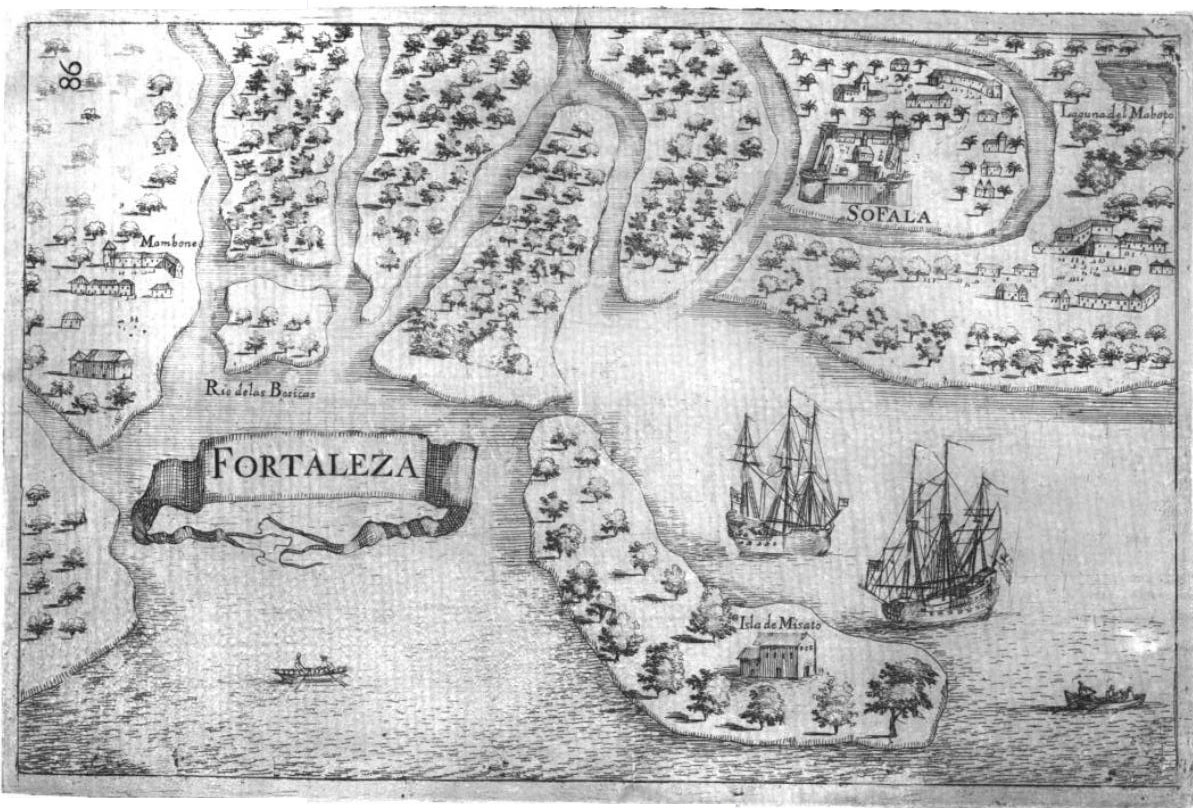
Sofala, from Manuel Faria e Sousa 1666 AD, Asia Portuguesa, v.1

Back in Sofala, things are not going well. In February 1506, soon after the Sofala fleet departed for India, the Portuguese garrison in Sofala is laid low by fevers (probably malaria - Sofala is embedded in a mangrove swamp). Only about thirty or so Portuguese soldiers remain capable of standing.

A group of Sofalese nobles, led by a certain Mengo Musaf (son-in-law of the sheikh Isuf), sets about trying to persuade the ageing ruler to abandon his treaty and expel the Portuguese. Mengo Musaf's party is opposed by another group of nobles, led by a certain 'Acute', who insist on allowing the Portuguese to stay. Sheikh Isuf is concerned with Portuguese reprisals, anxious to avoid the fate of Kilwa and Mombasa. However, Mengo Musaf points out that they can use the newly built Portuguese fort to defend themselves against any Portuguese attacks.

It was probably the news of the loss of young Anaia's caravels that finally seals their case. However, sheikh Isuf dares not risk a direct attack, and instead persuades a certain mainland Bantu chieftain named 'Moconde' (a Makonde chieftain, vassal of Monomatapa?) to bring some 5,000-6,000 of his best warriors to Sofala, and seize the fort, promising him the contents of the Portuguese factory as payment.

Moconde's forces arrive in Sofala in late February or March and lay siege to Fort São Caetano. However, the arrival of the Bantu warriors frighten many of the Swahili inhabitants of Sofala, about one hundred of whom (including Acute) proceed to take refuge in the Portuguese fort, thereby inadvertently bolstering the weakened Portuguese garrison. With the help of Musaf's nobles, Moconde's troops set about systematically filling the moat with branches, and begin their climb up the walls. Pêro de Anaia, with what remains of his diseased garrison and his new Swahili auxiliaries, leads a sally out and disperses the surprised Bantu besiegers in a bloody encounter.

The furious Moconde, accuses the Sofalese nobles of having deliberately misrepresented the strength of the garrison and of leading him into a trap. Despite their protests of innocence, Moconde indignantly withdraws his warriors from the city, and returns to the mainland (burning down some of the Swahili nobles' villages on their way, as a parting gesture).

That same night, in a bold operation, Anaia leads a Portuguese squad stealthily through the abandoned streets of Sofala and makes his way into the city's palace. The blind old sheikh Isuf is said to have thrown his sword towards the sound of the footsteps, managing to wound Anaia, but Isuf is himself immediately decapitated from behind by Manuel Fernandes.

In the morning, seeing the head of the sheikh Isuf mounted on the walls of the Portuguese fort, Sofala falls into chaos. The first instinct of the sons of the sheikh is to attack the fort, but this does not go very far. The Sofalese nobles assembled for the assault immediately fragment into competing factions to compete for the succession. In the strife, Anaia somehow manages to play the arbitrator, and secures the installation of a certain Suleiman, one of the sons of Isuf, as ruler of Sofala.

In March 1506, only a few days after these events, Pêro de Anaia himself is struck down by malaria and dies. The Portuguese garrison elect the factor Manuel Fernandes, the only European apparently immune to the fevers, as acting captain-major.

In early June, the ships of Cide Barbudo and Pedro Quaresma, who had been on a search-and-rescue mission in South Africa, arrive in Sofala harbor, intending to deliver the Portuguese king's new instructions to Pêro de Anaia. Instead they find the Sofala fort and garrison in a dilapidated state, 76 Portuguese are by now dead from malarial fever and the remainder weakened and starving for lack of food. Cide Barbudo decides to go on to India by himself, leaving Quaresma behind with his caravel to help replenish the plagued Portuguese garrison.

== Aftermath ==
Cide Barbudo stopped in Kilwa first, to see if assistance for Sofala could be procured from the Portuguese garrison there, only to find that that city too was in chaos. Following the assassination of the Portuguese-supported sultan a month or so earlier, violent strife had enveloped the city. Streams of refugees had left the once-great city of Kilwa practically deserted, save for roving gangs of partisans fighting each other in the streets. The Portuguese garrison was hunkered down in the fort, and had hardly any supplies of their own.

Cide Barbudo hurried on to India, reaching Cochin in August 1506, delivering his report on the disastrous conditions of both Sofala and Kilwa to the vice-roy D. Francisco de Almeida. Almeida dispatched Nuno Vaz Pereira to assume the capitaincy of Sofala and do what he could to restore its conditions. Pereira left India in October, stopping in Kilwa first. Miraculously, he manages to restore some semblance of order in Kilwa (although it quickly fell apart again after he left).

Arriving in Sofala in December 1506, Nuno Vaz Pereira invoked his credentials as the new captain of Sofala and relieved the factor Manuel Fernandes (much to the latter's annoyance - seemingly Fernandes had hoped Barbudo would secure Almeida appointed him.)

=== Move to Mozambique ===
Nuno Vaz Pereira's tenure did not last long. Vasco Gomes de Abreu, who had been sent directly from Lisbon to relieve Anaia, arrived in Sofala in September 1507. Abreu was quick to realize that Sofala's location would not do – its harbor was clogged with dangerous shoals, its location in a swamp made it too susceptible to disease. Moreover, the gold bounty that first drove the Portuguese to Sofala had been a mirage. The internal goldfields of the Monomatapa, after centuries of operation, were now exhausted to a trickle. Gold mining in the interior had gravitated north, near the Zambezi, and delivery was being directed to better-situated emerging new coastal towns like Quelimane and Angoche. The Portuguese presence in Sofala was not only hazardous, it was unnecessary.

Abreu immediately directed operations to capture nearby Mozambique Island, which had a much more suitable harbor and was disease-free. The Captaincy of Sofala was thus enlarged to include Mozambique Island. Much of the European garrison and administration was subsequently transferred to healthier Mozambique. Abreu erected Fort São Gabriel on Mozambique Island in late 1507, that would henceforth serve as the main garrison and capital of the capitaincy. Fort São Caetano of Sofala was effectively reduced to an outpost. Nonetheless, colonial governors of Portuguese Mozambique would continue to bear 'Captain of Sofala' as their primary formal title.

== See also ==
- 7th Portuguese India Armada (Almeida, 1505)
- Portuguese India Armadas
- Portuguese East Africa

== Sources ==
- Duarte Barbosa (c. 1518) O Livro de Duarte Barbosa [Trans. by M.L. Dames, 1918–21, An Account Of The Countries Bordering On The Indian Ocean And Their Inhabitants, 2 vols., 2005 reprint, New Delhi: Asian Education Services.]
- João de Barros (1552–59) Décadas da Ásia: Dos feitos, que os Portuguezes fizeram no descubrimento, e conquista, dos mares, e terras do Oriente.. [Dec. I, Lib 7.]
- Fernão Lopes de Castanheda (1551–1560) História do descobrimento & conquista da Índia pelos portugueses [1833 edition]
- Gaspar Correia (c. 1550s) Lendas da Índia, first pub. 1858-64, in Lisbon: Academia Real das Sciencias.
- Damião de Góis (1566–67) Crónica do Felicíssimo Rei D. Manuel
- Jerónimo Osório (1586) De rebus Emmanuelis [trans. 1752 by J. Gibbs as The History of the Portuguese during the Reign of Emmanuel London: Millar]
- Ludovico di Varthema (1510) Itinerario de Ludouico de Varthema Bolognese. 1863 translation by J.W. Jones, The Travels of Ludovico di Varthema, in Egypt, Syria, Arabia Deserta and Arabia Felix, in Persia, India, and Ethiopia, A.D. 1503 to 1508, London: Hakluyt Society.

Secondary:

- Campos, J.M. (1947) D. Francisco de Almeida, 1° vice-rei da Índia, Lisbon: Editorial da Marinha.
- Cunha, J.G. da (1875) "An Historical and Archaeological Sketch of the Island of Angediva", Journal of the Bombay Branch of the Royal Asiatic Society, Volume 11, p. 288-310 online
- Danvers, F.C. (1894) The Portuguese in India, being a history of the rise and decline of their eastern empire. 2 vols, London: Allen.
- Ferguson, D. (1907) "The Discovery of Ceylon by the Portuguese in 1506", Journal of the Ceylon Branch of the Royal Asiatic Society, Vol. 19, No. 59 p. 284-400 offprint
- Logan, W. (1887) Malabar Manual, 2004 reprint, New Delhi: Asian Education Services.
- Mathew, K.S. (1997) "Indian Naval Encounters with the Portuguese: Strengths and weaknesses", in Kurup, editor, India's Naval Traditions. New Delhi: Northern Book Centre.
- Newitt, M.D. (1995) A History of Mozambique. Bloomington: Indiana University Press.
- Quintella, Ignaco da Costa (1839–40) Annaes da Marinha Portugueza, 2 vols, Lisbon: Academia Real das Sciencias.
- Subrahmanyam, S. (1997) The Career and Legend of Vasco da Gama. Cambridge, UK: Cambridge University Press.
- Theal, G.M. (1898) Records of South-eastern Africa collected in various libraries & archive departments in Europe - Volume 2, London: Clowes for Gov of Cape Colony. [Engl. transl. of parts of Gaspar Correia]
- Theal, G.. M. (1902) The Beginning of South African History. London: Unwin.
- Theal, G.M. (1907) History and Ethnography of Africa South of the Zambesi - Vol. I, The Portuguese in South Africa from 1505 to 1700 London: Sonneschein.
- Whiteway, R. S. (1899) The Rise of Portuguese Power in India, 1497-1550. Westminster: Constable.
