= Sofala =

Seaport in Sofala Province of Mozambique

Coordinates: 20°09′S 34°43′E

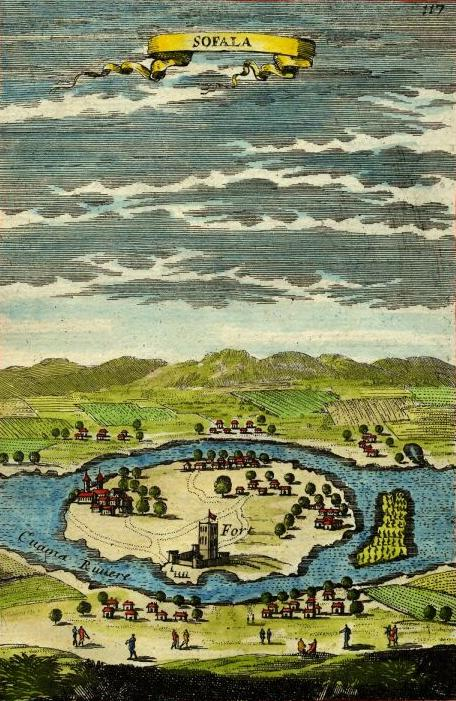
Sofala in 1683 AD, sketch by Mallet

Sofala [suˈfalɐ], at present known as Nova Sofala [ˈnovɐ suˈfalɐ], was a prominent Swahili city-state. It is located on the Sofala Bank in Sofala Province of Mozambique. The first recorded use of this port town was by Mogadishan merchants. One possible etymology for Sofala is "go and cultivate" or " go and dig" in the Somali language, showing the city as a hub for gold.

== History ==
One of the oldest harbours documented in Southern Africa, medieval Sofala was erected on the edge of a wide estuary formed by the Buzi River (called Rio de Sofala in older maps).

The Buzi River connected Sofala to the internal market town of Manica, and from there to the gold fields of Great Zimbabwe. Sometime in the 10th century, Sofala emerged as a small trading post and was incorporated into the greater global Indian Ocean trade network. It is stated that the first inhabitants of Sofala out of the East African coast came from Mogadishu, and that they were in search of gold. Merchants from the Sultanate of Mogadishu had long kept Sofala a secret from their Kilwan rivals, who up until then rarely sailed beyond Cape Delgado. In the 1180s, Sultan Suleiman Hassan of Kilwa (in present-day Tanzania) seized control of Sofala, and brought Sofala into the Kilwa Sultanate and the Swahili cultural sphere. The Swahili strengthened its trading capacity by having, among other things, rivergoing dhows ply the Buzi and Save rivers to ferry the gold extracted in the hinterlands to the coast.

Sofala's subsequent position as the principal entrepot of the Mwenemutapa gold trade prompted Portuguese chronicler Thomé Lopes to identify Sofala with the biblical Ophir and its ancient rulers with the dynasty of the Queen of Sheba. Alternately, in the late 19th century and the early 20th century, Augustus Henry Keane argued that Sofala was the Biblical Tarshish. Since the early 20th century, both notions have been discarded.

Although the revenues from Sofala's gold trade proved a windfall for the sultans of Kilwa and allowed them to finance the expansion of the Swahili commercial empire all along the East African coast, Sofala was not a mere subsidiary or outpost of Kilwa, but a leading town in its own right, with its own internal elite, merchant communities, trade connections and settlements as far south as Cape Correntes (and some across the channel in Madagascar). Formally, Sofala continued to belong to the Kingdom of Mwenemutapa, the Swahili community paying tribute for permission to reside and trade there. The Sultan of Kilwa had jurisdiction only over the Swahili residents, and his governor was more akin to a consul than a ruler. The city retained a great degree of autonomy, and could be quite prickly should the Sultan of Kilwa try to interfere in its affairs. Sofala was easily the most dominant coastal city south of Kilwa itself.

=== Portuguese arrival ===
Portuguese explorer and spy Pêro da Covilhã, travelling overland disguised as an Arab merchant, was the first European known to have visited Sofala in 1489. His secret report to Lisbon identified Sofala's role as a gold emporium (although by this time, the gold trade was quite diminished from its heyday). In 1501 Sofala was scouted from the sea and its location determined by captain Sancho de Tovar. In 1502, Pedro Afonso de Aguiar (others say Vasco da Gama himself) led the first Portuguese ships into Sofala harbor.

Aguiar (or Gama) sought out an audience with the ruling sheikh Isuf of Sofala (Yçuf in Barros Çufe in Goes). At the time, Isuf was engaged in a quarrel with Kilwa. The minister Emir Ibrahim had deposed and murdered the legitimate Sultan al-Fudail of Kilwa, and seized power for himself. Isuf of Sofala refused to recognize the usurper and was looking for a way to shake off Kilwa's lordship and chart an independent course for Sofala. The Portuguese, with their powerful ships, seemed to provide the key. At any rate, the elderly sheikh Isuf realized it would be better to make allies rather than enemies out of them, and agreed to a commercial and alliance treaty with the Kingdom of Portugal.

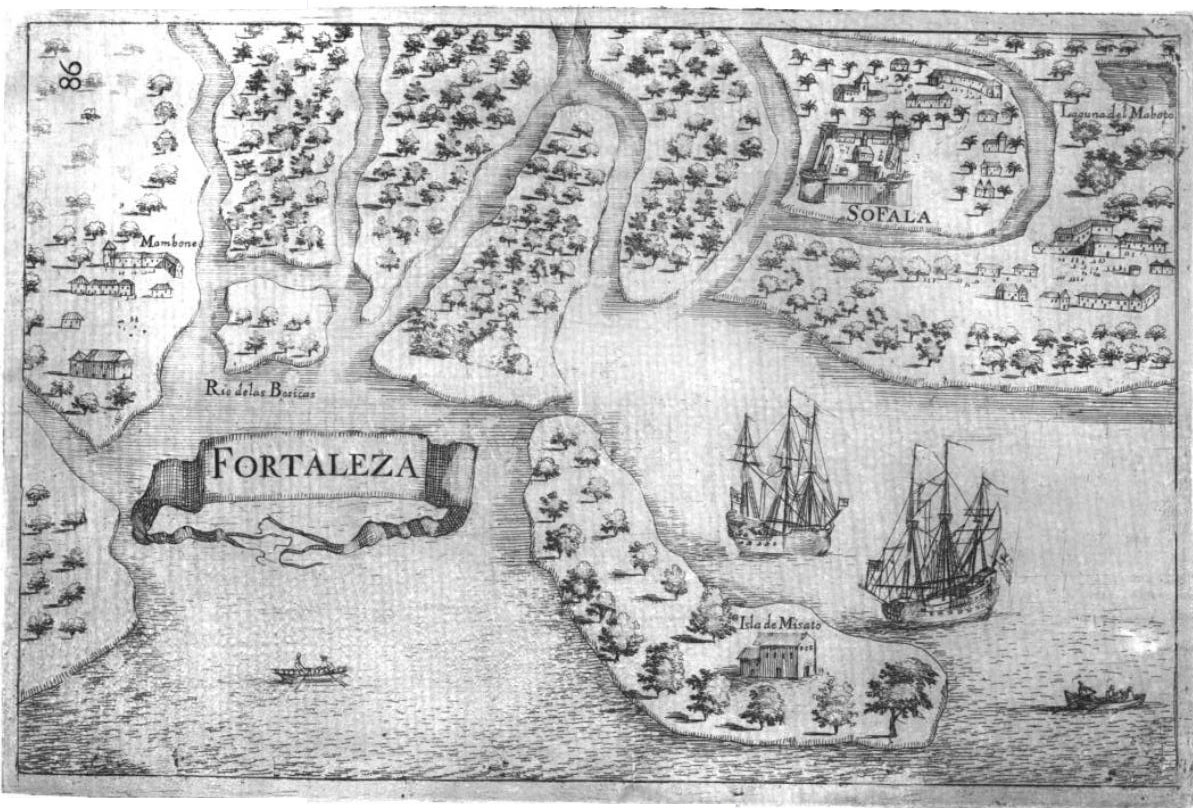
Sofala, from Manuel Faria e Sousa, Asia Portuguesa, vol. 1, 1666

This was followed upon in 1505 when Pêro de Anaia (part of the 7th Armada) was granted permission by sheikh Isuf to erect a factory and fortress near the city. Fort São Caetano of Sofala was the second Portuguese fort in East Africa (the first, at Kilwa, was built only a few months earlier). Anaia used stone imported for the purpose from Europe. (It was subsequently reused for construction of Beira's cathedral.)

The Portuguese fort did not last very long. Much of the garrison was quickly decimated by fevers (probably malaria). In late 1507, the new Portuguese captain of Sofala, Vasco Gomes de Abreu, captured the island of Mozambique. Gradually, much of the Sofala garrison, officers and operations were transferred to the island, reducing Fort Sofala to a mere outpost. Nonetheless, colonial governors of Portuguese Mozambique would continue to bear 'Captain of Sofala' as their primary official title.

=== Conclusion ===
If not for its gold trade, Sofala would likely have been avoided by both the Swahili and the Portuguese. The entrance to Sofala estuary was blocked by a long moving sand bank, which was followed by hazardous shoals, allowing boats to approach safely only at high tide. The shores of Sofala were a mangrove swamp, replete with stagnant waters and malarial mosquitos. As a harbor, it was less than suitable for Portuguese ships, which is why the Portuguese were quick to seize Mozambique Island in 1507, and make that their preferred harbor.

The gold trade also proved to be a disappointment. The old gold fields were largely exhausted by the time the Portuguese arrived, and gold production had moved further north. Market towns were erected on the Zambezi escarpment, to which Sofala was less convenient as an outlet than the rising new towns of Quelimane and Angoche.

The shifting sands and boundaries of the Buzi estuary have since allowed the sea to reclaim much of old Sofala. There are very few ruins in modern New Sofala to suggest the town's former grandeur and wealth.

In its heyday, the town of Sofala itself was formed by two towns, one close to the water on a sand flat, the other on higher and healthier ground. The Sofalese also had a satellite settlement to the north at the mouth of the Pungwe River called Rio de São Vicente in old maps. As grand old Sofala sank into the ocean, modern Beira was erected on the site of that outpost.

Sofala lost its remaining commercial preeminence once Beira was established 32 kilometres (20 mi) to the north in 1890. The harbour was once reputed to be capable of holding a hundred vessels, but has since silted up due to deforestation of the banks of the river and deposition of topsoil in the harbour.
