= Pero de Anaia =

Portuguese colonial governor

Pero de Anaia or Pedro d'Anaya (Note: Pero or Pêro are archaic variant of Pedro.) or Anhaya or da Nhaya or da Naia (died March 1506) was a Castilian-Portuguese 16th-century knight, who established and became the first captain-major of the Portuguese Fort São Caetano in Sofala, and thus the first colonial governor of Portuguese East Africa (Mozambique).

== Background ==
According to chronicler João de Barros, Pero de Anaia was the son of Castilian nobleman Diego de Anaya, who fought in the Castilian civil war of the 1470s for the Beltraneja party, alongside King Afonso V of Portugal. He moved or was exiled to Portugal at the conclusion of that war. His son Pero de Anaia became a knight of the Portuguese king's household.

== Expedition to Sofala ==
In early 1505, King Manuel I of Portugal assigned Pero de Anaia the duty of establishing a permanent Portuguese fortress and factory in the East African town of Sofala, at that time a reluctant vassal of the Kilwa Sultanate and major entrepot for the Monomatapa gold trade.

In late March 1505 Anaia set out with his own ship, the Sant'Iago (also called the Nuncia) as part of the 7th Portuguese India Armada commanded by D. Francisco de Almeida. However, Anaia's ship foundered in the Tagus estuary upon departure, and he was forced to return to Lisbon. A new expedition was quickly assembled, and Anaia set out again on 18 May 1505, this time at the head of his own six-ship squadron bound for Sofala, carrying much building equipment.

After arriving in Sofala in early September 1505, his squadron more-or-less intact, Pero de Anaia secured permission from the ruling sheikh Isuf of Sofala for permission to erect a Portuguese fortress and factory in the island-city.

== Captain of Sofala ==
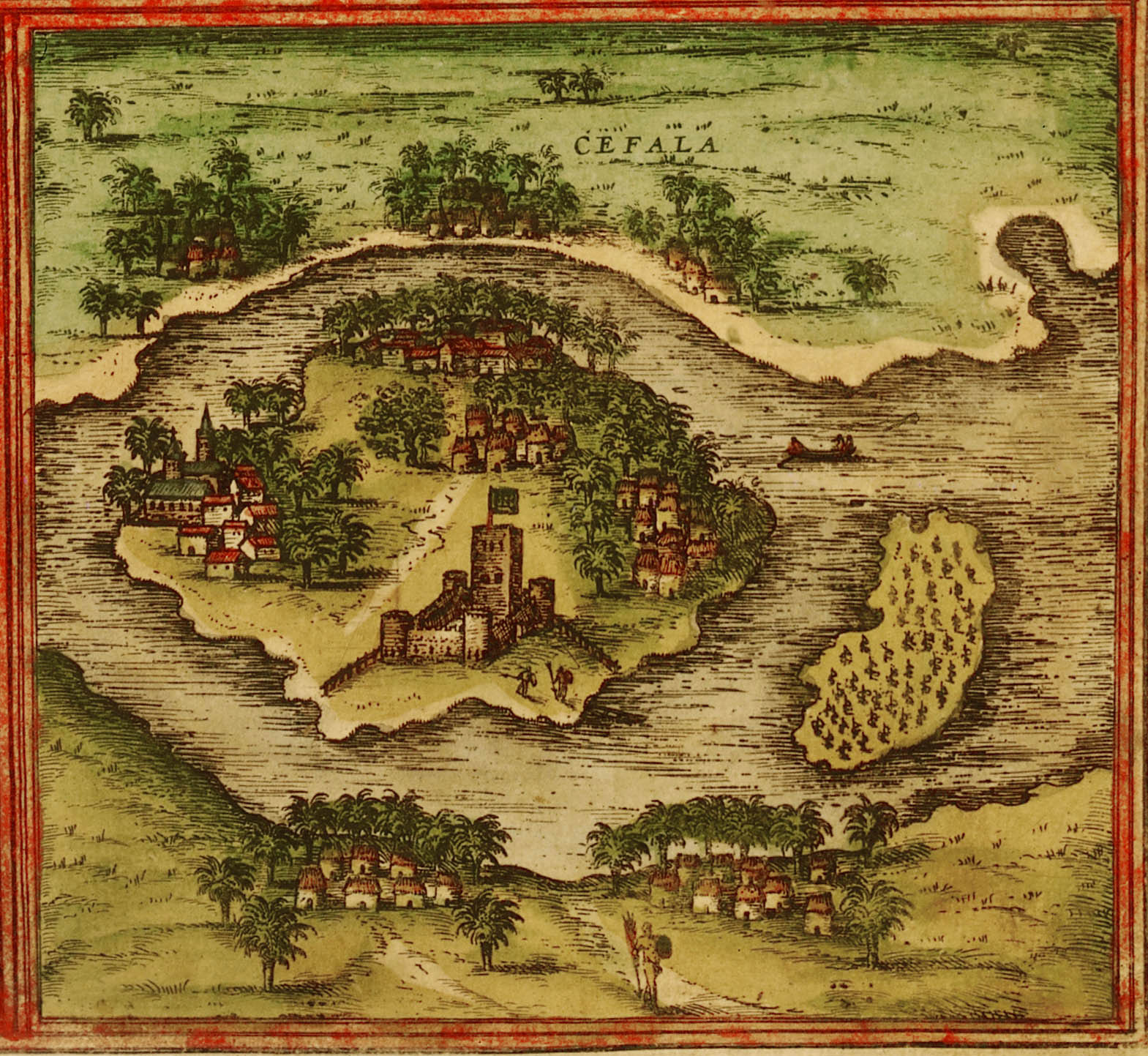
City of Sofala (Cefala), c. 1572, with Fort São Caetano visible

By November 1505 the perimeter of the Portuguese Fort São Caetano of Sofala was essentially finished and Pero de Anaia opened the royal credentials assuming the title of Capitão-Mor (Captain-Major) of the fortress and garrison.

Fort São Caetano was first permanent Portuguese colony in East Africa, and the kernel of what was to become the Portuguese colonial province of Mozambique. Consequently, Pero de Anaia, being the first 'Captain of Sofala', is generally considered the first Portuguese colonial governor of Mozambique.

As per his instructions, in late January or early February 1506, Pero de Anaia dispatched four of his ships to Portuguese India. He placed the remaining two caravels under his son, Francisco de Anaia, to serve a local coastal patrol (The younger Anaia had a commission as capitão-mor do mar de Sofala).

The beginnings of Fort Sofala were difficult. The Portuguese soon found out they had little or no means to procure food and other supplies. Moreover, being situated on a mangrove swamp, fevers (probably malaria and/or yellow fever) quickly overwhelmed most of the Portuguese garrison. To cap their misfortunes, the hapless younger Anaia crashed both the patrol ships on shoals near Mozambique, leaving Fort Sofala without means of securing external supplies or communication.

It was precisely at this moment of great weakness, in late February or early March 1506, that a group of Sofalese nobles who had opposed the Portuguese presence, induced a mainland Bantu chieftain Moconde to lead an assault on the weakened Portuguese fort. Pero de Anaia defended the fort with his handful of remaining healthy soldiers, bolstered by a number of Swahili auxiliaries. The besiegers were scattered. In the aftermath, Anaia broke into the royal palace and killed sheikh Isuf of Sofala for conspiring in the treachery (it is said the sheikh Isuf, a blind octogenarian, threw his sword at the sound of footsteps, and managed to wound Anaia, before being himself killed.)

The next day, a revenge attack on Fort Sofala broke down, when rival Sofalese nobles began to quarrel with each other for succession. Somehow Pero de Anaia managed to play the role of arbitrator, and secured the installation of Isuf's son, Suleiman, as the new sheikh of Sofala. Suleiman promptly put an end to Sofalese intrigues against the Portuguese.

Pero de Anaia, however, did not survive long. In early March 1506, just a few days after the Bantu assault on the fort, Anaia himself fell victim to the malarial fevers and died at Sofala. The Portuguese factor, Manuel Fernandes de Meireles, apparently the only European man immune to the fevers, was elected by what remained of the sick garrison as acting captain of Sofala.

== Aftermath ==
In June 1506, two Portuguese ships of Cide Barbudo and Pedro Quaresma arrived in Sofala, hoping to deliver letters from King Manuel I with new instructions for Anaia. They found Fort Sofala in a terrible shape, most of the garrison dead or dying of fevers and starving for food. Leaving Quaresma behind to bolster the fort and procure relief, Barbudo rushed to Portuguese India to deliver his report to the vice-roy D. Francisco de Almeida. Hearing of the disastrous conditions, Almeida dispatched Nuno Vaz Pereira to assume the capitaincy of Sofala at the end of 1506 and do what he could to restore its conditions.

Pereira was superseded in September 1507 by Vasco Gomes de Abreu, who had been sent directly by the king from Lisbon. Abreu took command of Sofala, and directed operations to capture nearby Mozambique Island, which had a much more suitable harbor than the shoals-clogged Sofala. The Captaincy of Sofala was thus enlarged to include Mozambique Island. Much of the European garrison and administration was subsequently transferred to healthier Mozambique, and Fort Sofala was effectively reduced to an outpost, although colonial governors of Portuguese East Africa continued to bear 'Captain of Sofala' as their primary title.

== See also ==
- Portuguese expedition to Sofala (Anaia, 1505)
- 7th Portuguese India Armada (Almeida, 1505)

== Sources ==
- João de Barros (1552–59) Décadas da Ásia: Dos feitos, que os Portuguezes fizeram no descubrimento, e conquista, dos mares, e terras do Oriente..
- *Fernão Lopes de Castanheda (1551–1560) História do descobrimento & conquista da Índia pelos portugueses [1833 edition]
- Newitt, M.D. (1995) A History of Mozambique. Bloomington: Indiana University Press.
- Theal, G.M. (1902) The Beginning of South African History. London: Unwin.

Preceded by None	Portuguese Captain of Sofala; 1505-1506	Succeeded by Manuel Fernandes de Meireles
