= Antão Vaz =

Variety of grape

- Grape (Vitis)
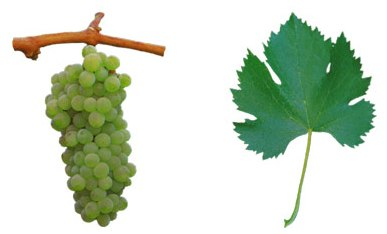
- Color of berry skin: Blanc
- Species: Vitis vinifera
- Also called: Antonio Vaz
- Origin: Portugal
- Pedigree parent 1: Cayetana blanca
- Pedigree parent 2: João Domingos
- Notable regions: Alentejo
- Formation of seeds: Complete
- Sex of flowers: Hermaphrodite
- VIVC number: 493

Antão Vaz is a native Portuguese white wine grape variety. Genetic testing has shown it to be a cross of the white Cayetana blanca (through which it is a grandchild of Hebén) and the almost unknown red João Domingos, which is thought to be extinct in its native Portugal. It is grown primarily in the Alentejo region, with additional plantings around Lisbon and in the Península de Setúbal. It is vigorous and productive, and requires a hot climate. The thick skins on these large loosely packed grapes enable them to withstand high heat and dehydration. It produces complex, light yellow wines with citrus and tropical aromas. Depending on the time of harvest, the wines can range from very acidic to ripe and alcoholic.
