= Fort São Caetano =

16th century fort in modern day Mozambique

Coordinates: 20°09′S 34°44′E

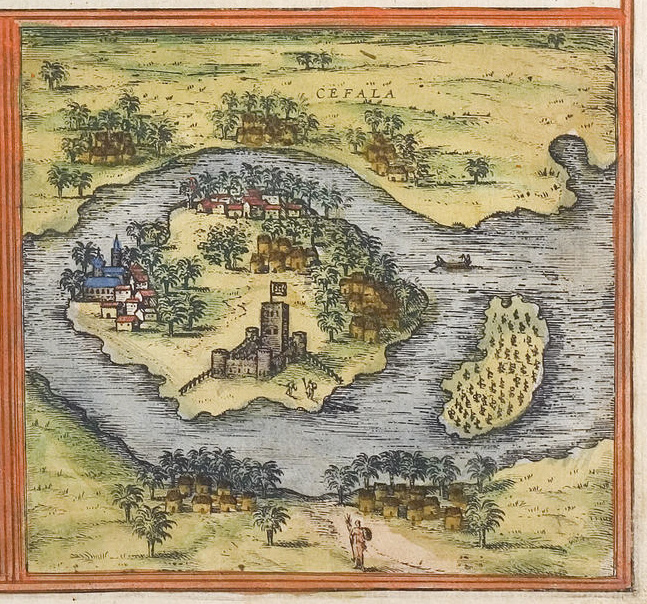
1572 depiction of Sofala (Cefala) from the Civitates orbis terrarum

Forte de São Caetano de Sofala, also known as Fortaleza de Sofala or Sǎo Caetano Fort of Sofala, is a 16th-century fort that was built in present-day Sofala, Mozambique. Construction of the fort began in 1505, after Pedro d'Anhaya captured the city. The original fort was built out of mangrove wood. It was rebuilt in stone in 1507.
