= Cape Correntes =

Cape or headland in Mozambique

Cape Correntes (sometimes also called "Cape Corrientes" in English) (Port.: "Cabo das Correntes") is a cape or headland in the Inhambane Province in Mozambique. It sits at the southern entry of the Mozambique Channel.•23°55′36″S 35°31′48″E

Cape Correntes was historically regarded as one of the most terrifying obstacles facing sailing ships in the Indian Ocean. It is named after the exceptionally fast southward current that passes here, part of the Mozambique Current, with a tendency to form eddies at this cape. It is also a confluence point of winds, with the capacity to produce unpredictably violent gusts and whirlwinds.

Medieval dhows of the Kilwa Sultanate rarely (if ever) sailed below it, thereby making Cape Correntes the southern boundary of the Swahili Coast and cultural zone. Local legends said the cape was inhabited by mermaids that lured unfortunate sailors to their deaths.

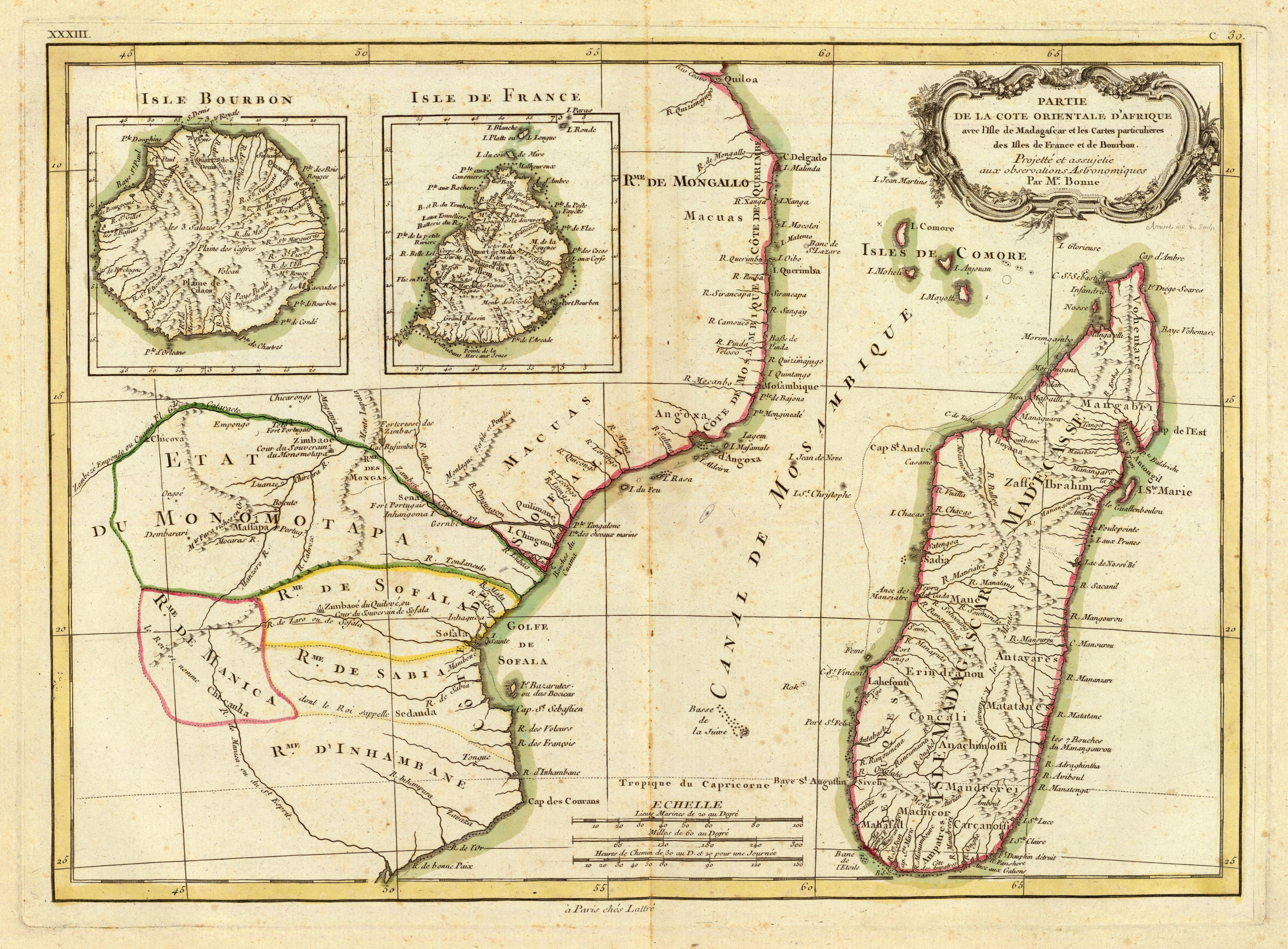
French map of Mozambique Channel, c. 1791. Cape Correntes is denoted at the bottom entrance.

In the 16th century, Portuguese ships on the 'India Run' that charted an entry into the Mozambique Channel too near to the coast often had difficulty surpassing Cape Correntes, and were sometimes pushed backwards by the fast contrary current and complicated winds (most famously, Vasco da Gama, in January, 1498, the first European captain to attempt to surpass it from below, was forced backwards to Inharrime). Sailing in the other direction was even more dangerous, as the velocity of the current at the cape could easily throw a ship headlong into the numerous shoals and protruding rocks that characterize this stretch of coast. It is estimated that 30% of the ships lost in the yearly Portuguese India Armadas in the 16th and 17th centuries capsized around Cape Correntes, more than any other location. As a result, for much of the 16th century, captains returning from India to Portugal with heavy-laden (and thus less manoeuvrable) ships were forbidden from sailing into the Mozambique Channel and were required to chart a course via the 'outer route', that is, east of Madagascar island, through the Mascarenes, coming back under the island, thereby avoiding the treacherous and fast waters of Cape Correntes.

The peculiar terrors of Cape Correntes were alleviated with the development of reliable instruments to measure longitude, allowing ships to avoid sailing near the headland, and chart a more comfortable course through the middle of the Mozambique Channel.
