= Firearms of Japan =

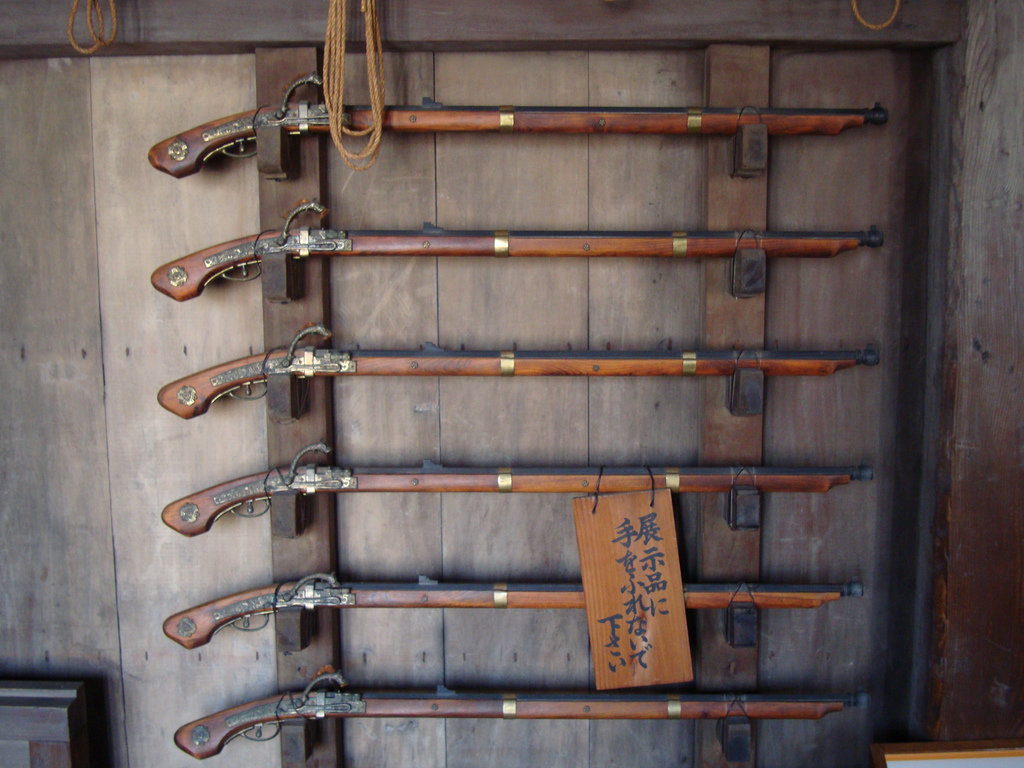
A rack of Japanese tanegashima (matchlocks) of the Edo period, Himeji Castle, Japan.

Firearms were introduced to Japan in the 13th century during the first Mongol invasion and were referred to as teppō. Portuguese firearms were introduced in 1543, and intense development followed, with strong local manufacture during the period of conflicts of the late 16th century. Hōjutsu, the art of gunnery, is the Japanese martial art dedicated to firearms usage.

== Teppō ==
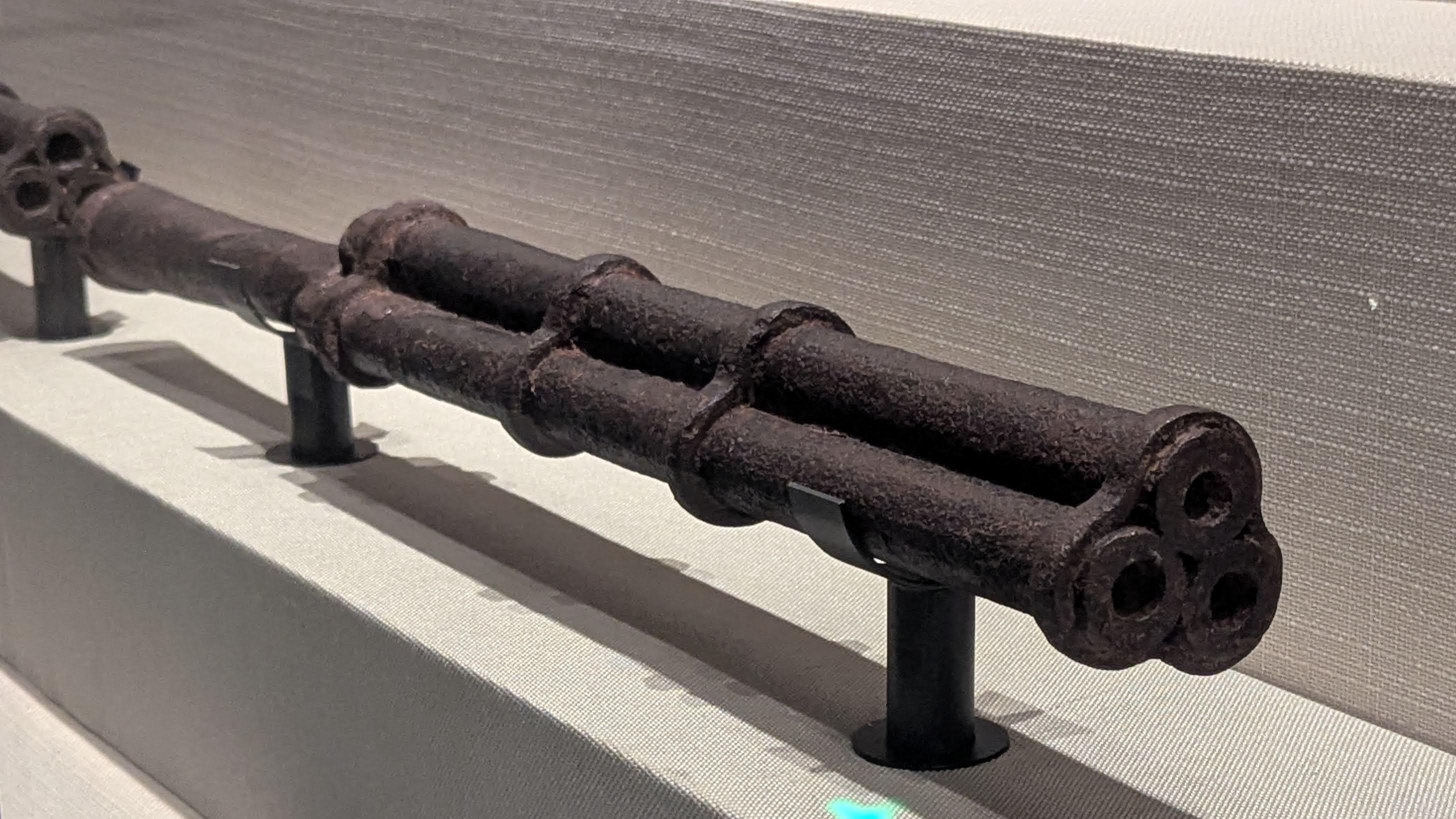
A Chinese triple-barreled hand cannon

Japan's earliest documented encounters with gunpowder weapons occurred during the Mongol invasions of Japan in the late 13th century. During the first invasion in 1274, Mongol forces employed explosive projectiles known as teppō (鉄砲; literally "iron cannon"), which produced loud bangs. These weapons were bombs filled with gunpowder rather than true firearms, but the same term was subsequently applied to guns introduced from mainland Asia and later Europe.

By the mid-15th century, early firearms (likely imported from the Ming Dynasty) were firmly established in the military of the Ryukyu Kingdom. In 1450, Korean visitors to Ryukyu described sophisticated hand cannons overseen by a royal firearms official, while archaeological excavations at Katsuren Castle have uncovered early iron bullets. Ryukyuan firearms at the time included a three barrel gun resembling the Chinese san yan chong.

Firearms were also known in mainland Japan, though they were uncommon. In 1466, a Ryukyuan envoy reportedly startled spectators by discharging a teppō in Kyoto. A later historical account describes a Buddhist priest presenting a firearm brought from China to Hōjō Ujitsuna in 1510. These early guns saw limited military use and unlike later matchlocks, did not transform Japanese warfare.

== Tanegashima (matchlock) ==
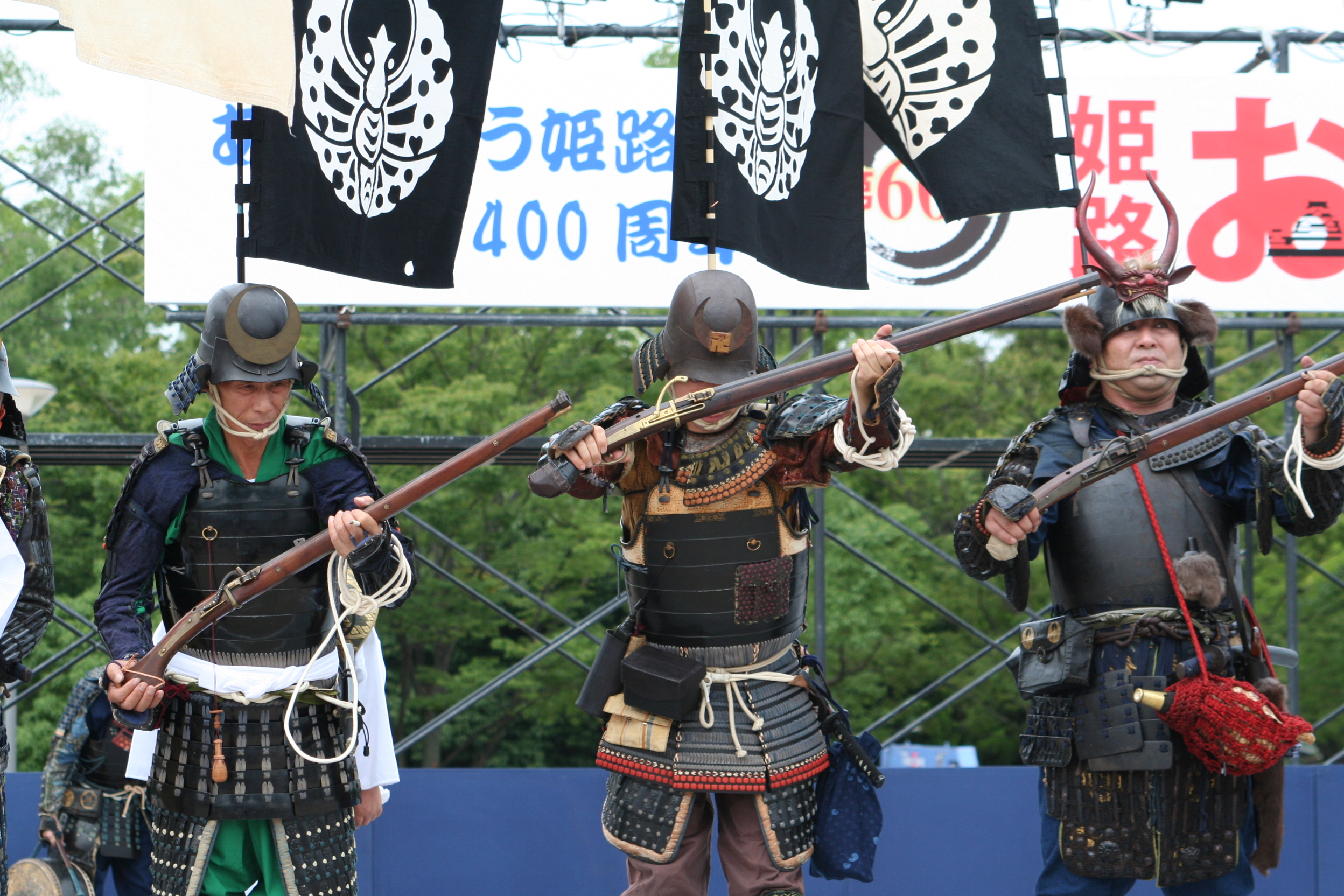
Modern demonstration of the tanegashima (matchlocks) of the Edo period.

The first documented introduction of the matchlock which became known as the tanegashima was through the Portuguese in 1543, António Mota and Francisco Zeimoto. The tanegashima seems to have been based on snap matchlocks that were produced in the armory of Goa in Portuguese India, which was captured by Portugal in 1510. The name tanegashima came from the island where a Chinese junk with Portuguese adventurers on board was driven to anchor by a storm. The lord of the Japanese island Tanegashima Tokitaka (1528–1579) purchased two matchlock muskets from the Portuguese and put a swordsmith to work in copying the matchlock barrel and firing mechanism. Within a few years the use of the tanegashima in battle forever changed the way war was fought in Japan. From 1560, firearms were used in large battles in Japan. In his memoirs published in 1614, the Portuguese adventurer-turned-author Fernão Mendes Pinto placed himself in that first landing party, although this claim has been roundly discredited and in fact contradicts his claims to be simultaneously in Burma at the time. However, Pinto does appear to have visited Tanegashima soon thereafter.

== History ==
=== Sengoku period ===
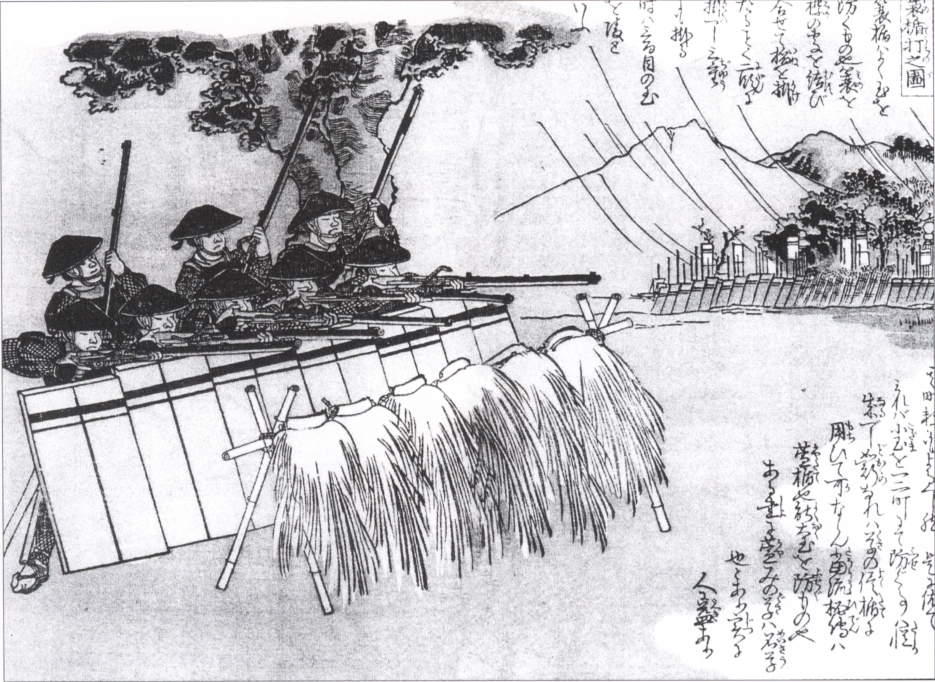
Ashigaru (foot soldiers) using matchlocks (tanegashima) from behind shields (tate).

Japan was at war during the Sengoku period between 1467 and 1600, as feudal lords vied for supremacy. Matchlock guns were used extensively and had a decisive role in warfare. In 1549, Oda Nobunaga ordered 500 matchlocks to be made for his armies. The benefits of firearms were still relatively questionable however compared with other weapons. At the time, guns were still rather primitive and cumbersome. According to one estimate in 16th century Japan, an archer could fire 15 arrows in the time a gunner would take to load, charge, and shoot a firearm. Effective range was only 80 to 100 meters. At that maximum distance, a bullet could easily bounce off armour. Furthermore, matchlocks were vulnerable to humid or rainy conditions as the powder would become damp. However, firearms could be manned effectively by farmers or non-samurai low-ranking soldiers.

The Japanese soon developed various techniques to improve the effectiveness of their firearms. They developed a serial firing technique to create a continuous rain of bullets on the enemy. They also developed bigger calibers to increase lethality. Protective boxes in lacquerware were invented to be able to fire matchlocks in the rain, as well as systems to accurately fire weapons at night by keeping fixed angles thanks to measured strings.

As a result, in the year 1567, Takeda Shingen announced that "Hereafter, the guns will be the most important arms. Therefore, decrease the number of spears per unit, and have your most capable men carry guns". At the Battle of Nagashino in 1575, 3,000 arquebusiers helped win the battle, firing by volleys of 1,000 at a time, and secured across a river and breastwork to effectively stop enemy infantry and cavalry charges while being protected.

In the year 1584 Ikeda Sen led a troop of 200 women armed with firearms at the Battle of Komaki and Nagakute and in 1600 at the Battle of Sekigahara, a rare example of a teppō unit, or musketeer unit consisting only of women.

Japan became so enthusiastic about the new weapons that it may have surpassed every European country in absolute numbers produced. Japan also used the guns in the Imjin War in the 1592 invasion of Korea, in which about a quarter of the invasion force of 160,000 were gunners. They were initially extremely successful and captured Seoul just 18 days after their landing at Busan.

=== Edo period ===
The internal war in Japan was won by Tokugawa Ieyasu, who established the Tokugawa shogunate, a powerful entity that would maintain peace and prosperity in Japan for the following 250 years. From the mid-17th century, Japan decided to close itself to interaction with the outside world through its policy of sakoku.

Firearms were used less frequently because the Edo period did not have many large-scale conflicts in which a matchlock arquebus would be of use. Matchlock firearms have few uses outside of war. A matchlock is useless as a sidearm because it cannot be drawn and fired at a moment's notice. The wielder must first light the rope and for that he must start a fire. Swords and knives were the self-defense weapons of choice before the 19th century. Some samurai used matchlocks for hunting.

Aside from practical considerations, the warrior aristocracy of Japan (the samurai) disliked guns because they were so easy to use that a peasant could feasibly learn to wield them, whereas most peasants could not afford to spend years learning archery and swordfighting. During the wars of the Sengoku, samurai grudgingly encouraged the recruitment and training of peasant musketeers because the priority was to win battles, but after the war they discouraged further development.

Starting in 1607, the shogun ordered that all gunsmiths in Japan move their workshops to Nagahama. The gunsmiths of Sakai were exempted from this edict because the shogun's influence was too weak there. All orders for guns had to be cleared with the government in Edo.

In 1636, some Dutch traders gifted the shogun a dozen flintlock pistols, but the shogun had no interest in adopting this technology even though it would have been easy for his gunsmiths to replicate.

Isolation did not decrease the production of guns in Japan—on the contrary, there is evidence of around 200 gunsmiths in Japan by the end of the Edo period. But the social life of firearms had changed: as the historian David L. Howell has argued, for many in Japanese society, the gun had become less a weapon than a farm implement for scaring off animals.

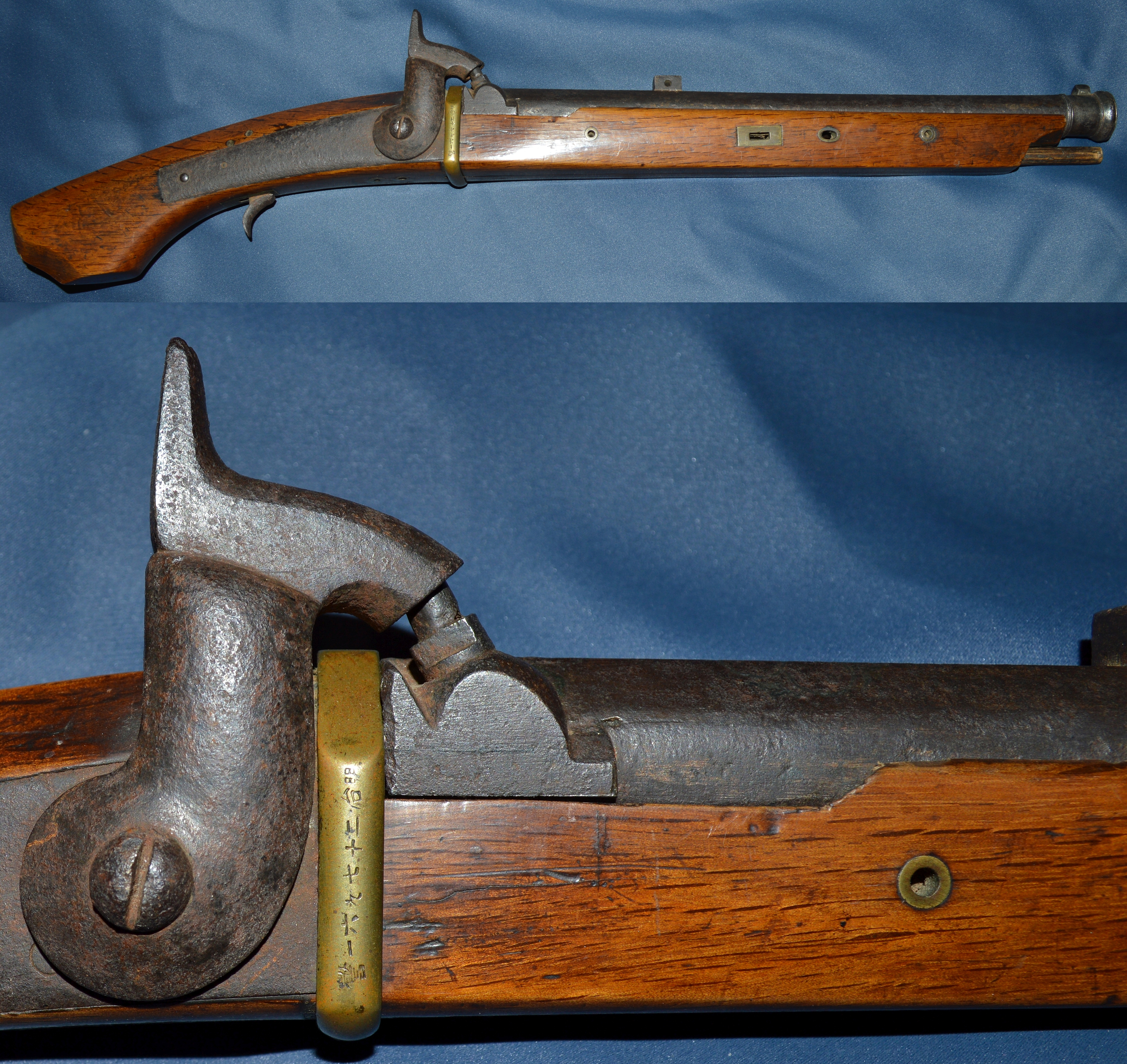
Japanese percussion pistol, 19th century, possibly converted from a matchlock.

A few Japanese started to study and experiment with recent Western firearms from the beginning of the 19th century especially as a means to ward off visits from foreign ships, such as the incursion by the Royal Navy frigate HMS Phaeton in 1808. Through the process of rangaku (the studying of Western science through the Dutch), airguns were developed by Kunitomo Ikkansai c. 1820–1830. From 1828, experiments were made with flintlock mechanisms.

The Nagasaki samurai Takashima Shūhan (高島秋帆) started to import flintlock guns from the Netherlands known as "geweer" from the 1840s. He made the first modern Western military demonstration for the Tokugawa shogunate, in Tokumarugahara (north of Edo) on 27 June 1841.

With the arrival of Commodore Perry in 1853, Japan was forced to open its borders to foreigners and the Japanese feared an invasion would eventually befall them as had happened to China. The Japanese thereafter began enthusiastically importing and studying modern firearms so that they could develop a modern army.

=== Boshin War ===
The mounting civil war in Japan and the opposition of various feudal lords against the bakufu during the Late Tokugawa shogunate led to serious rearming until the 1867 Boshin War. At the same time, technological progress was extremely fast in the West, with the introduction of the rifle, breech-loading and even repeating firearms, so that Japanese armies were equipped with composite technologies, with weapons imported from countries as varied as France, Germany, the Indians, Britain and the United States, and coexisting with traditional Tanegashima guns.

During the Boshin War, most shogunate vassal troops used "geweer"-style smoothbore guns. These guns were rather ancient and had limited capabilities, with an effective lethal range of about 50 meters, and a firing rate of about two rounds per minute. Much more effective Minié rifles were also used by the armies directly under the command of the shōgun, the bakufu troops. The Daimyō of Nagaoka, an ally of the shōgun, possessed two Gatling guns and several thousand modern rifles. The shogunate is known to have placed an order for 30,000 modern Dreyse needle guns in 1866. In 1867, orders were placed for 40,000 state-of-the-art French Chassepot rifles, a part of which reached Edo by year's end. Antiquated Tanegashima matchlock guns are also known to have been used by the bakufu however.

Imperial troops mainly used Minié rifles, which were much more accurate, lethal, and had a much longer range than the smoothbore "geweer"-style guns, although, being also muzzle-loading, they were similarly limited to two shots per minute. Improved breech-loading mechanisms, such as the Snider, developing a rate of about ten shots a minute, are known to have been used by troops of the Tosa Domain against the shogunate's Shōgitai, at the Battle of Ueno in July 1868. In the second half of the conflict, in the northeast theater, Tosa Province troops are known to have used American-made Spencer repeating rifles. American-made handguns were also popular, such as the 1863 Smith & Wesson Model No. 2 Army, which was imported to Japan by the Scottish trader Thomas Blake Glover and used by the Satsuma forces.

=== Modern period ===
For some time after the Meiji Restoration, Japan continued to use imported weapons. The newly created Imperial Japanese Army used firearms intensively against more traditional samurai rebellious forces during the Satsuma rebellion in 1877, with an average of 320,000 rounds of ammunition fired daily during the conflict. After the Satsuma rebellion, Japan relied extensively on the French Chassepot.

Japan finally developed its own model, the Murata rifle, derived from the French Fusil Gras mle 1874. This was Japan's first locally made service rifle, and was used from 1880 to 1898. An industrial infrastructure, such as the Koishikawa Arsenal had to be established to produce such new weapons.

Later, Japan developed the very successful bolt action Arisaka series rifles, which was the Japanese service rifle until the end of World War II. Japan produced relatively few submachine guns during World War II, the most numerous model was the Type 100 submachine gun of which 24,000–27,000 were produced, compared, for example, with the British Sten of which millions were produced. During the war, the Japanese worked on a copy of the American semi-automatic M1 Garand (the Type 5 rifle) but only a few hundred were made before the end of the war and it did not enter service.

After the end of the war, with the dissolution of the Imperial Japanese Army, and the establishment of the National Police Reserve in 1952 and the Japan Self-Defense Forces in 1954, Japan relied on M1 Garand rifles provided by the United States. In the mid-1950s however, Japan's Defense Agency started to develop battle rifles of its own, such as the Howa Type 64 and assault rifles like the Howa Type 89 which has been gradually replacing the former. In 2019, the Japan Ground Self-Defense Force received the first Howa Type 20 rifles, which are set to replace earlier assault rifles.

== See also ==
- Artillery of Japan
- Firearm and Sword Possession Control Law
