= LANGAS =

French research project

Langues Générales d'Amérique du Sud (Spanish: Lenguas Generales de América del Sur, Guarani: Ñe’ẽnguéra ymaguare ojeporuvéva América del Surpe, Quechua: Sudamericapi panpa simikuna) is a project of the French Centre National de la Recherche Scientifique dedicated to the study of documents found in South American countries in several indigenous languages written mainly by missionaries, there are others that were written by indigenous people. The project has an official website in which people can search texts found on the corpus, the text is seen in a table comparing paleographic and modern transcription and the translation to the non-indigenous language spoken in the same place.

== Project ==
The Spanish and Portuguese colonization of South America had the linguistic effect of widening the geographical location of some of wide spread languages in Pre-Columbian era (mostly Quechua, Aymara, Guarani and Tupi). These were the main means of communication between natives and Europeans, they allowed to articulate new economic and administrative areas. Described as 'general', these languages worked as interfaces between the colonial administration and the aboriginal people and almost exclusive mean of evangelization.
