= Portuguese maritime exploration =

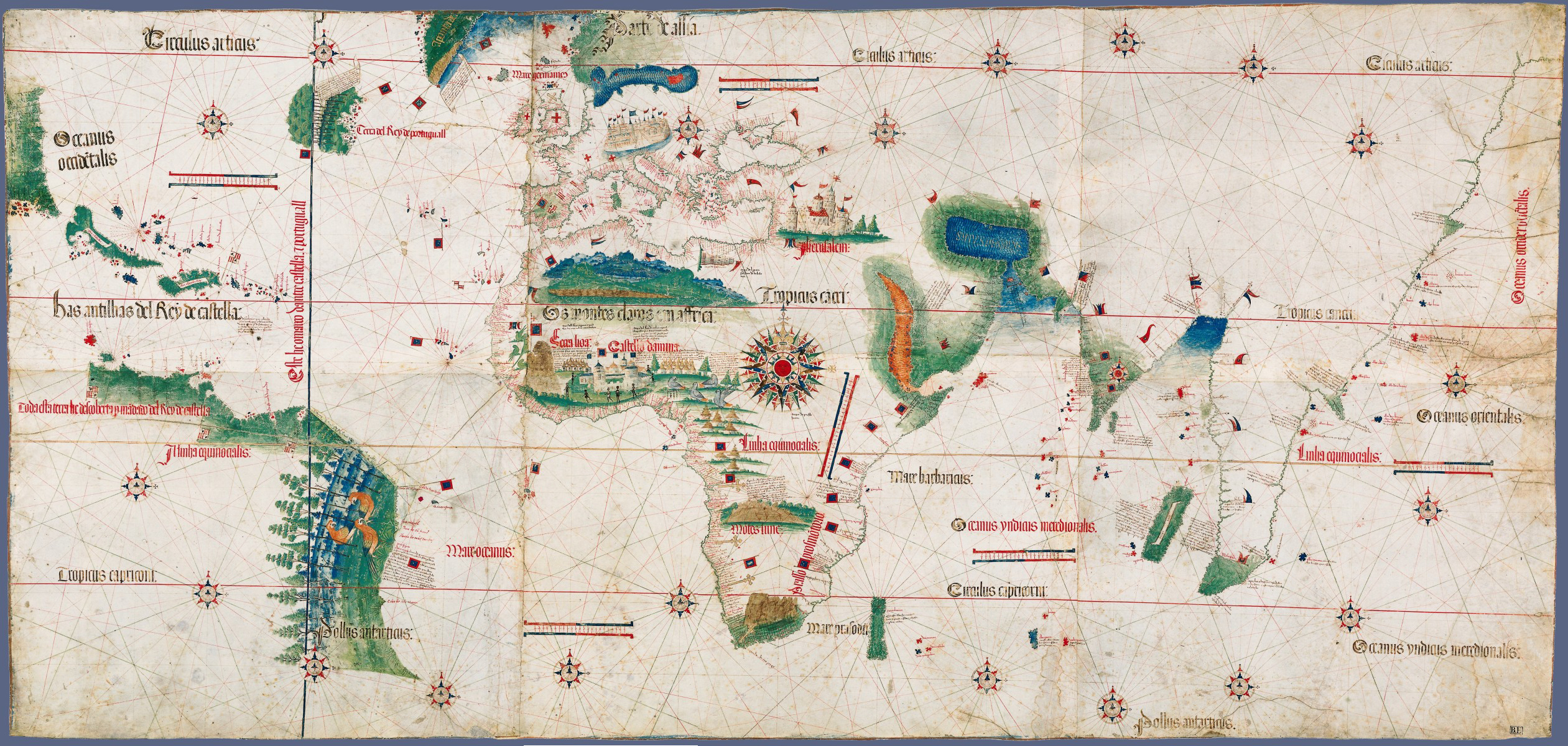
The Cantino planisphere, made by an anonymous cartographer in 1502, shows the world as it was understood by Europeans after their great explorations at the end of the fifteenth century.

Portuguese maritime explorations resulted in numerous territories and maritime routes recorded by the Portuguese on journeys during the 15th and 16th centuries. Portuguese sailors were at the vanguard of European exploration, chronicling and mapping the coasts of Africa and Asia, then known as the East Indies, Canada and Brazil (the West Indies), in what became known as the Age of Discovery.

Methodical expeditions started in 1419 along the coast of West Africa under the sponsorship of prince Henry the Navigator, whence Bartolomeu Dias reached the Cape of Good Hope and entered the Indian Ocean in 1488. Ten years later, in 1498, Vasco da Gama led the first fleet around Africa to the Indian subcontinent, arriving in Calicut and starting a maritime route from Portugal to India. Portuguese explorations then proceeded to southeast Asia, where they reached Japan in 1542, forty-four years after their first arrival in India. In 1500, the Portuguese nobleman Pedro Álvares Cabral became the first European to discover Brazil.

== History ==
=== Origins ===
In 1297, King Dinis of Portugal took personal interest in the development of exports and organised that of surplus foreign production to European countries. On May 10, 1293, he instituted a maritime insurance fund for Portuguese traders living in the County of Flanders, which were to pay certain sums according to tonnage, accrued to them when necessary. Wine and dried fruits from Algarve were sold in Flanders and England, salt from Setúbal and Aveiro was a profitable export to northern Europe, and leather and kermes, a scarlet dye, were also exported. Portugal imported armour and munitions, fine clothes, and several manufactured products from Flanders and Italy.

In 1317, King Dinis made an agreement with Genoese merchant sailor Manuel Pessanha (Pessagno), appointing him first Admiral with trade privileges with his homeland in return for twenty warships and crews, with the goal of defending the country against Muslim pirate raids (Barbary corsairs), thus laying the basis for the Portuguese Navy and establishment of a Genoese merchant community from the Republic of Genoa in Portugal. Forced to reduce their activities in the Black Sea, the Republic of Genoa had turned to North Africa for trade in wheat and olive oil and a search for gold – navigating also into the ports of Bruges (Flanders) and England. Genoese and Florentine communities were established in Portugal, which profited from the enterprise and financial experience of these rivals of the Republic of Venice.

In the second half of the fourteenth century outbreaks of bubonic plague led to severe depopulation: the economy was extremely localised in a few towns, and migration from the country led to the abandonment of agricultural land and an increase in rural unemployment. Only the sea offered opportunities, with most people settling in fishing and trading areas along the coast. Between 1325 and 1357 Afonso IV of Portugal granted public funding to raise a proper commercial fleet and ordered the first maritime explorations, with the help of Genoese, under command of admiral Manuel Pessanha. In 1341 the Canary Islands, already known to Genoese seafarers, were officially rediscovered under the patronage of the Portuguese king, but in 1344 Castile disputed ownership of them, further propelling the Portuguese naval efforts. The first victims of slave raids by Portuguese and Spanish were the Guanches of the Canary Islands, a people of Berber origin, who put up fierce resistance but were reduced to near extinction by pillaging and enslavement.

=== Atlantic exploration (1418–1488) ===
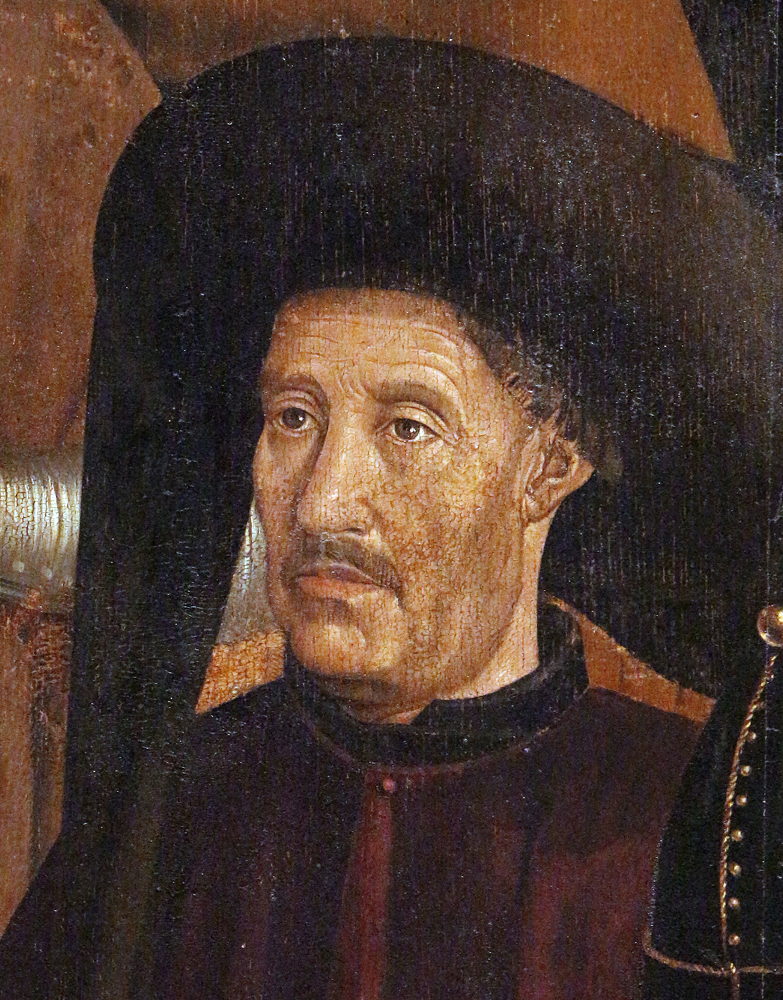
Prince Henry the Navigator, generally credited as the driving force behind Portuguese maritime exploration.

In 1415, the Portuguese occupied the North African city of Ceuta to gain a foothold in Morocco and control shipping through the Strait of Gibraltar. They also hoped to extend Christianity and provide an outlet for Portuguese nobles looking to gain riches and honor in war. Among the participants of the action was the young Prince Henry the Navigator. Appointed governor of the Order of Christ in 1420, while personally holding profitable monopolies on resources in Algarve, he took the lead role in encouraging Portuguese maritime exploration until his death in 1460. He invested in sponsoring voyages down the coast of Mauritania, gathering a group of merchants, shipowners, and other stakeholders interested in new opportunities for maritime trade. Later his brother Prince Pedro granted him a royal monopoly of all profits from trading within the areas discovered.

In 1418, two of Henry's captains, João Gonçalves Zarco and Tristão Vaz Teixeira were driven by a storm to Porto Santo an uninhabited island off the coast of Africa which may have been known to Europeans since the 14th century. In 1419 Zarco and Teixeira made a landfall on Madeira. They returned with Bartolomeu Perestrelo, and Portuguese settlement of the islands began. There, wheat and later sugarcane were cultivated, as in Algarve, by the Genoese, becoming profitable activities. This helped both them and Prince Henry become wealthier.

A Portuguese attempt to capture Grand Canary, one of the nearby Canary Islands, which had been partially settled by Spaniards in 1402 was unsuccessful and met with protestations from Castile. Although the exact details are uncertain, cartographic evidence suggests the Azores were probably discovered in 1427 by Portuguese ships sailing under Henry's direction, and settled in 1432, suggesting that the Portuguese were able to navigate at least 745 miles (1,200 km) from the Portuguese coast.

At around the same time as the unsuccessful attack on the Canary Islands, the Portuguese began to explore the North African coast. Sailors feared what lay beyond Cape Bojador at the time, as Europeans did not know what lay beyond on the African coast, and did not know whether it was possible to return once it was passed. Henry wished to know how far the Muslim territories in Africa extended, and whether it was possible to reach the source of the lucrative tran-Saharan caravan gold trade and perhaps to join forces with the long-lost Christian kingdom of Prester John that was rumoured to exist somewhere to the east.

In 1434, one of Prince Henry's captains, Gil Eanes, passed this obstacle. Once this psychological barrier had been crossed, it became easier to probe further along the coast. Within two decades of exploration, Portuguese ships had bypassed the Sahara. Westward exploration continued over the same period: Diogo de Silves discovered the Azores island of Santa Maria in 1427 and in the following years Portuguese mariners discovered and settled the rest of the Azores.

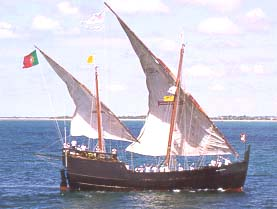
The caravel was an existing ship type that was prominent in Portuguese exploration from about 1440

Henry suffered a serious setback in 1437 after the failure of an expedition to capture Tangier, having encouraged his brother, King Edward, to mount an overland attack from Ceuta. The Portuguese army was defeated and only escaped destruction by surrendering Prince Ferdinand, the king's youngest brother. After the defeat at Tangier, Henry retired to Sagres on the southern tip of Portugal where he continued to direct Portuguese exploration until his death in 1460.

In 1443, Prince Pedro, Henry's brother, granted him the monopoly of navigation, war, and trade in the lands south of Cape Bojador. Later this monopoly would be backed by the Papal bulls Dum Diversas (1452) and Romanus Pontifex (1455), granting Portugal a trade monopoly for the newly discovered countries.

The caravel, an existing ship type, was used in exploration from about 1440. It had a number of advantageous characteristics. These included shallow draft, which was suitable for approaching unknown coasts, and an efficient combination of hull shape (including a rudder attached to the sternpost, unlike some other contemporary types with side-mounted steering oars) and lateen rig, which gave a fast-sailing vessel which had better windward sailing ability than other vessels of the time.

Portuguese navigators reached ever more southerly latitudes, advancing at an average rate of one degree a year. Senegal and Cape Verde Peninsula were reached in 1445. In the same year, the first overseas feitoria (trading post) was established under Henry's direction, on the island of Arguin off the coast of Mauritania. It was created to attract Muslim traders and monopolize the business in the routes traveled in North Africa, starting the chain of Portuguese feitorias along the coast. In 1446, Álvaro Fernandes pushed on almost as far as present-day Sierra Leone, and the Gulf of Guinea was reached in the 1460s.

==== Exploration after Prince Henry ====
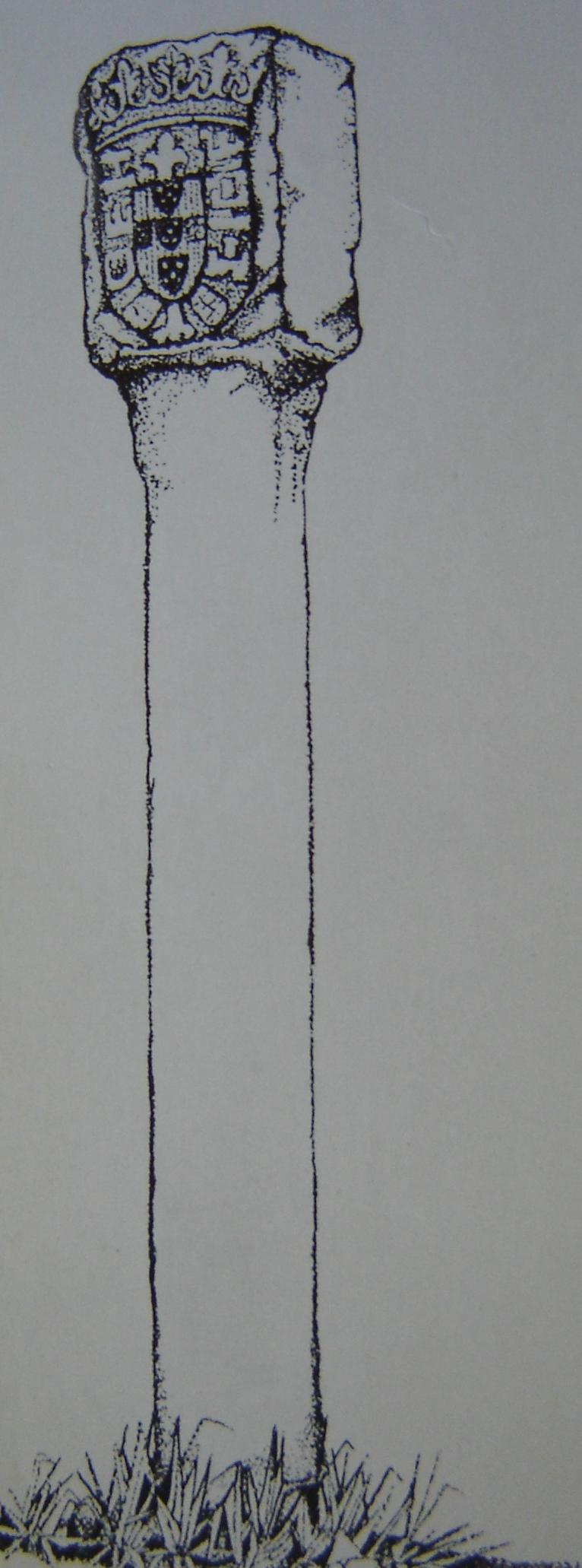
An illustration of the padrão Diogo Cão erected at Cape St. Mary, Angola.

As a result of the first meager returns of the African explorations, in 1469 king Afonso V granted the monopoly of trade in part of the Gulf of Guinea to merchant Fernão Gomes, for an annual payment of 200,000 reals. Gomes was also required to explore 100 leagues (480 km) of the coast each year for five years. He employed explorers João de Santarém, Pedro Escobar, Lopo Gonçalves, Fernão do Pó, and Pedro de Sintra, and exceeded the requirement. Under his sponsorship, Portuguese explorers crossed the equator into the Southern Hemisphere and found the islands in the Gulf of Guinea, including São Tomé and Príncipe.

In 1471, Gomes' explorers reached Elmina on the Gold Coast (present day Ghana), and discovered a thriving overland gold trade between the natives and visiting Arab and Berber traders. Gomes established his own trading post there, which became known as “A Mina” ("The Mine"). Trade between Elmina and Portugal grew in the next decade. In 1481, the recently crowned João II decided to build São Jorge da Mina fort (Elmina Castle) and factory to protect this trade, which was then held again as a royal monopoly.

In 1482, Diogo Cão discovered the mouth of the Congo River. In 1486, Cão continued to Cape Cross, in present-day Namibia, near the Tropic of Capricorn.

Iberian mare clausum claims during the Age of Discovery.

In 1488, Bartolomeu Dias rounded the Cape of Good Hope near the southern tip of Africa, disproving the view that had existed since Ptolemy that the Indian Ocean was separate from the Atlantic. Also at this time, Pêro da Covilhã reached India via Egypt and Yemen, and visited Madagascar. He recommended further exploration of the southern route.

As the Portuguese explored the coastlines of Africa, they left behind a series of padrões, stone crosses inscribed with the Portuguese coat of arms marking their claims, and built forts and trading posts. From these bases, the Portuguese engaged profitably in the slave and gold trades. Portugal enjoyed a virtual monopoly of the Atlantic slave trade for over a century, exporting around 800 slaves annually. Most were brought to the Portuguese capital Lisbon, where it is estimated black Africans came to constitute 10 percent of the population.

==== Tordesillas division of the world (1492) ====
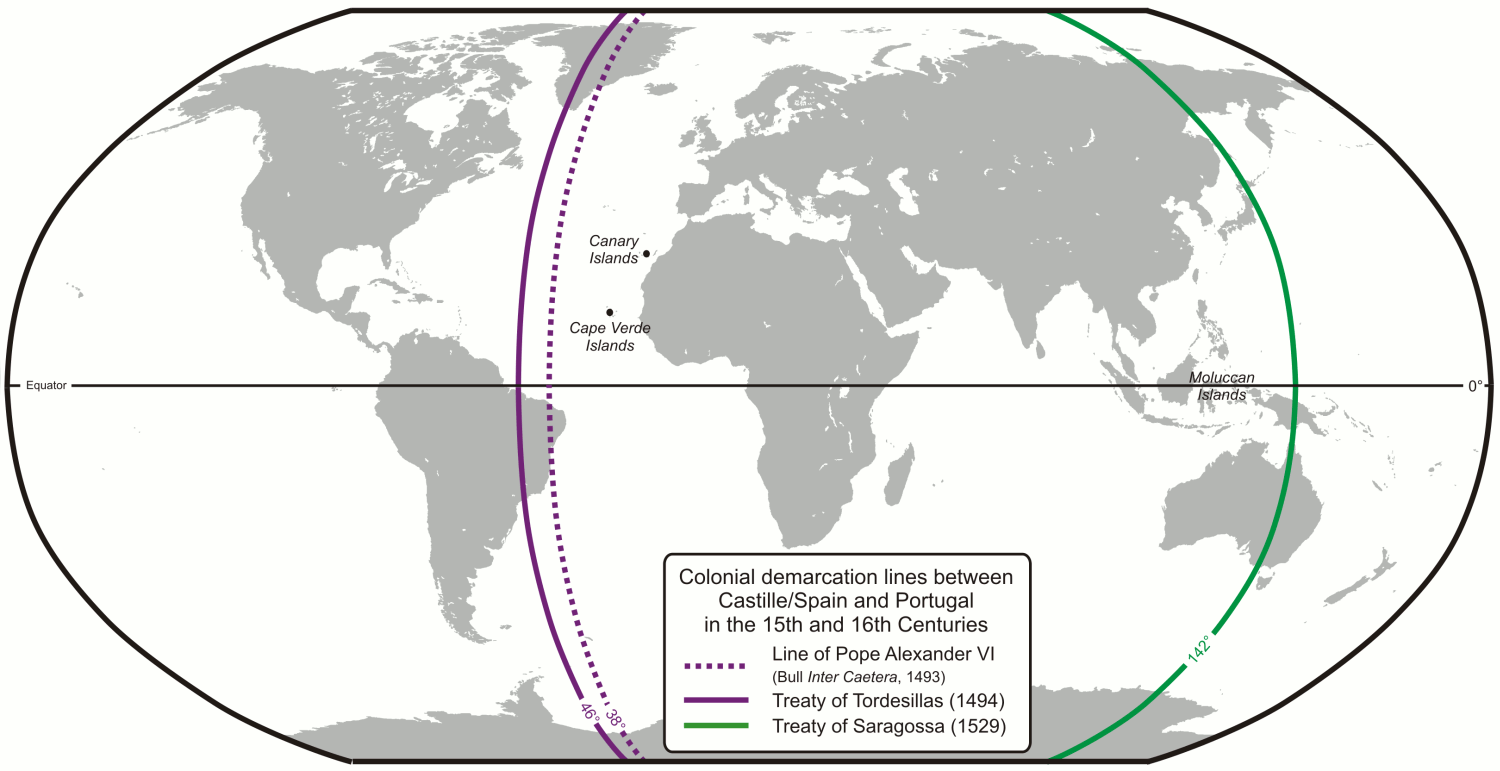
The 1494 Tordesillas Treaty meridian dividing the world between Portugal and Castille/Spain (purple) and the Moluccas antimeridian (green), set at the Treaty of Zaragoza, 1529

In 1492, Christopher Columbus's discovery for Spain of the New World, which he believed to be Asia, led to disputes between the Spanish and Portuguese. These were eventually settled by the Treaty of Tordesillas in 1494 which divided the world outside of Europe in an exclusive duopoly between the Portuguese and the Spanish, along a north–south meridian 370 leagues, or 970 miles (1,560 km), west of the Cape Verde islands. However, as it was not possible at the time to correctly measure longitude, the exact boundary was disputed by the two countries until 1777.

The completion of these negotiations with Spain is one of several reasons proposed by historians for why it took nine years for the Portuguese to follow up on Dias's voyage to the Cape of Good Hope, though it has also been speculated that other voyages were, in fact, taking place in secret during this time. Whether or not this was the case, the long-standing Portuguese goal of finding a sea route to Asia was finally achieved in a ground-breaking voyage commanded by Vasco da Gama.

==== Reaching India and Brazil (1497–1500) ====
The route followed in Vasco da Gama's first voyage (1497–1499)

Vasco da Gama's squadron left Portugal on 8 July 1497, consisting of four ships and a crew of 170 men. It rounded the Cape and continued along the coast of Southeast Africa, where a local pilot was brought on board who guided them across the Indian Ocean, reaching Calicut in western India in May 1498. After some conflict, da Gama got an ambiguous letter for trade with the Zamorin of Calicut, leaving there some men to establish a trading post.

Vasco da Gama's voyage to Calicut was the starting point for deployment of Portuguese feitoria posts along the east coast of Africa and in the Indian Ocean. Shortly after, the Casa da Índia was established in Lisbon to administer the royal monopoly of navigation and trade. Exploration soon lost private support, and took place under the exclusive patronage of the Portuguese Crown.

The second voyage to India was dispatched in 1500 under Pedro Álvares Cabral. While following the same south-westerly route across the Atlantic Ocean as da Gama (to take advantage of the most favorable winds), Cabral made landfall on the Brazilian coast. This was probably an accidental discovery, but it has been speculated that the Portuguese secretly knew of Brazil's existence and that it lay on their side of the Tordesillas line. Cabral recommended to the Portuguese King that the land be settled, and two follow-up voyages were sent in 1501 and 1503. The land was found to be abundant in pau-brasil, or brazilwood, from which it later inherited its name, but the failure to find gold or silver meant that for the time being Portuguese efforts were concentrated on India.

=== Indian Ocean explorations (1497–1542) ===
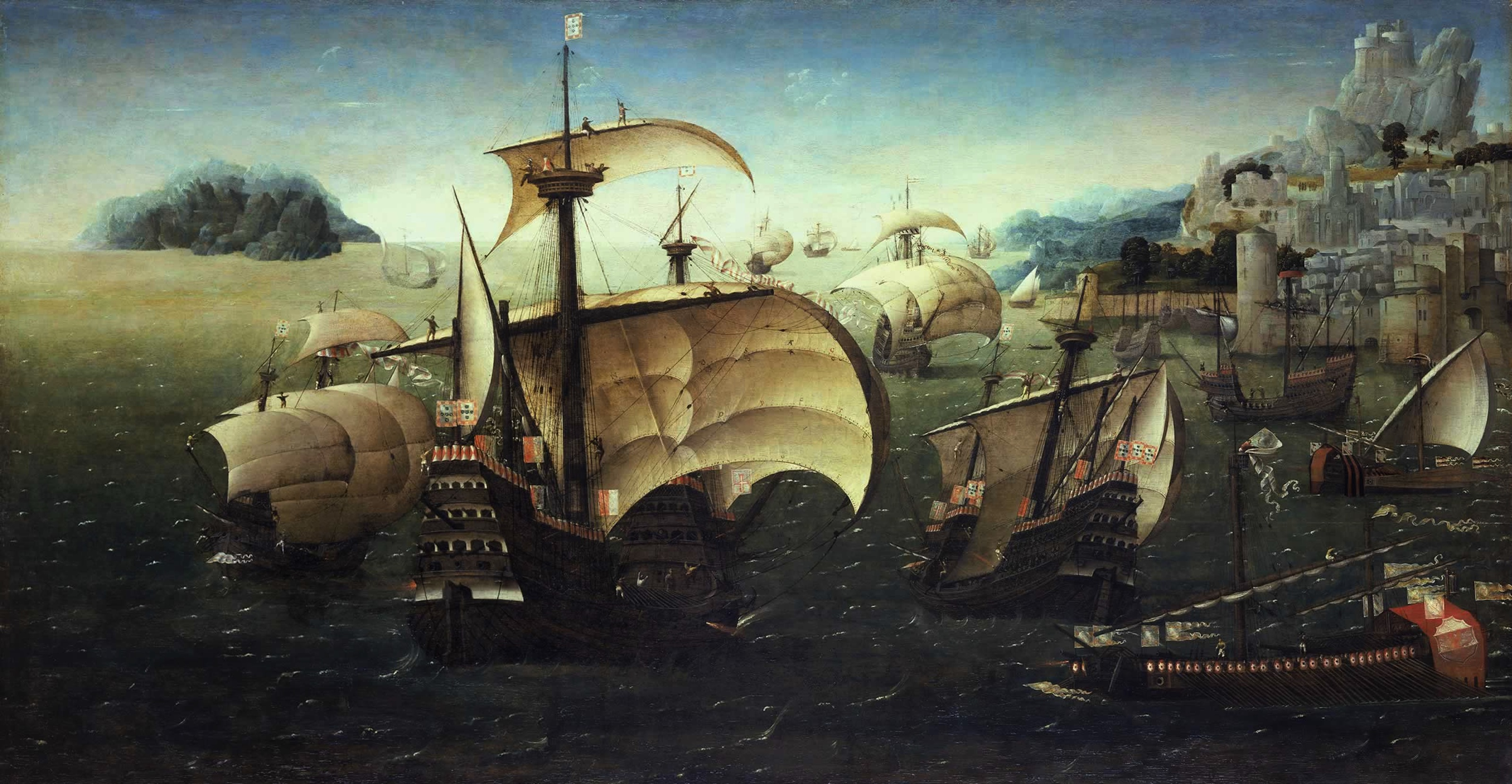
The carrack Santa Catarina do Monte Sinai and other Portuguese Navy ships in the 16th century.

The aim of Portugal in the Indian Ocean was to ensure the monopoly of the spice trade. Taking advantage of the rivalries that pitted Hindus against Muslims, the Portuguese established several forts and trading posts between 1500 and 1510. In East Africa, small Islamic states along the coast of Mozambique, Kilwa, Brava, Sofala and Mombasa were destroyed, or became either subjects or allies of Portugal. Pêro da Covilhã had reached Ethiopia (via the Indian Ocean coast in Somalia, traveling secretly overland, as early as 1490; a diplomatic mission reached the ruler of that nation on October 19, 1520.

In 1500, the second fleet to India (which also made landfall in Brazil) explored the East African coast in Southeast Africa, where Diogo Dias discovered the island that he named St. Lawrence, later known as Madagascar. This fleet, commanded by Pedro Álvares Cabral, arrived at Calicut in September, where the first trade agreement in India was signed. For a short time a Portuguese factory was installed there, but it was attacked by Muslims on December 16 and several Portuguese, including the scribe Pero Vaz de Caminha, died. After bombarding Calicut as a retaliation, Cabral went to rival Kochi.

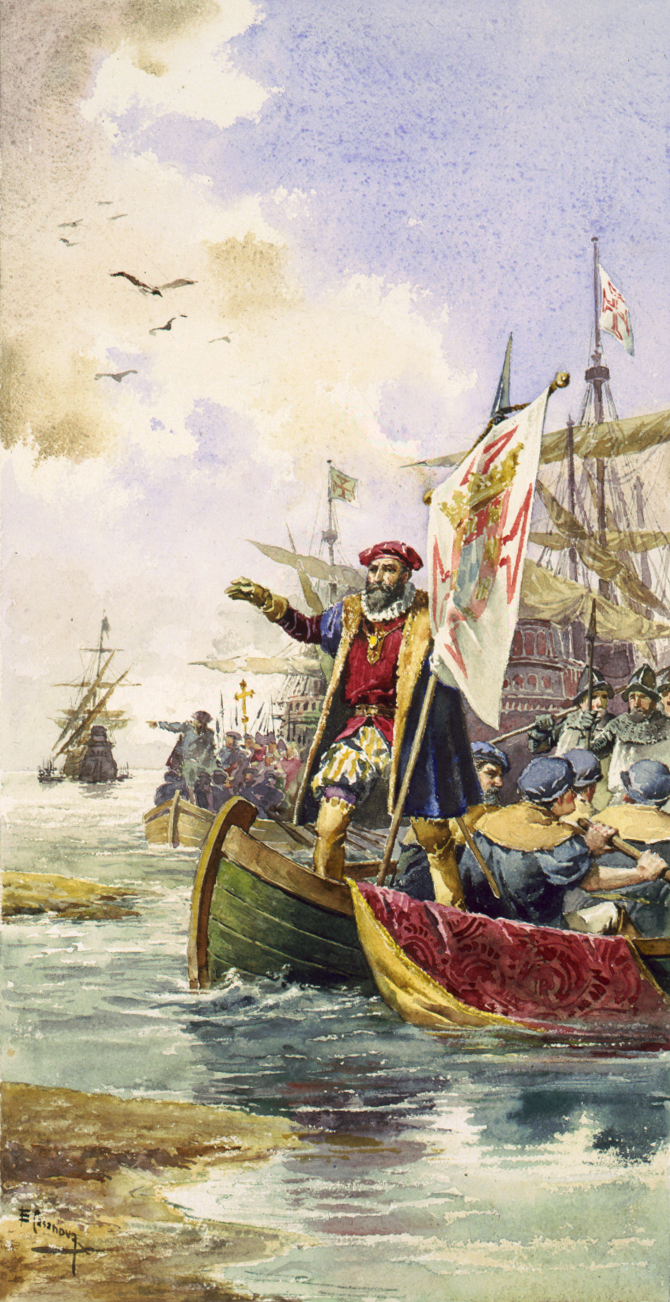
Vasco da Gama lands in Calicut on May 20th 1498.

Profiting from the rivalry between the Maharaja of Kochi and the Zamorin of Calicut, the Portuguese were well received and seen as allies, getting a permit to build a fort (Fort Manuel) and a trading post that was the first European settlement in India. There in 1503 they built the St. Francis Church. In 1502 Vasco da Gama took the island of Kilwa on the coast of Tanzania, where in 1505 the first fort of Portuguese East Africa was built to protect ships sailing in the East Indian trade.

In 1505, king Manuel I of Portugal appointed Francisco de Almeida first Viceroy of Portuguese India for a three-year period, starting the Portuguese government in the east, headquartered at Kochi. That year the Portuguese conquered Kannur where they founded St. Angelo Fort. The Viceroy's son Lourenço de Almeida arrived in Ceylon (modern Sri Lanka), where he discovered the source of cinnamon. Finding it divided into seven rival kingdoms, he established a defense pact with the kingdom of Kotte and extended the control in coastal areas, where in 1517 was founded the fortress of Colombo.

In 1506, a Portuguese fleet under the command of Tristão da Cunha and Afonso de Albuquerque, conquered Socotra at the entrance of the Red Sea and Muscat in 1507, having failed to conquer Ormuz, following a strategy intended to close those entrances into the Indian Ocean. That same year, fortresses were built in the Island of Mozambique and Mombasa on the Kenyan coast. Madagascar was partly explored by Tristão da Cunha and in the same year Mauritius was discovered.

In 1509, the Portuguese won the sea Battle of Diu against the combined forces of the Ottoman Sultan Beyazid II, the Sultan of Gujarat, the Mamlûk Sultan of Cairo, the Samoothiri Raja of Kozhikode, the Venetian Republic, and the Ragusan Republic (Dubrovnik). The Portuguese victory was critical for its strategy of control of the Indian Ocean: the Turks and Egyptians withdrew their navies from India, leaving the seas to the Portuguese, setting its trade dominance for almost a century, and greatly assisting the growth of the Portuguese Empire. It also marked the beginning of European colonial dominance in Asia. A second Battle of Diu in 1538 finally ended Ottoman ambitions in India, and confirmed Portuguese hegemony in the Indian Ocean.

Under the government of Albuquerque, Goa was taken from the Bijapur sultanate in 1510 with the help of Hindu privateer Timoji. Coveted for being the best port in the region, mainly for the commerce in Arabian horses for the Deccan sultanates, it allowed the Portuguese to move on from their initial guest stay in Cochin. Despite constant attacks, Goa became the seat of the Portuguese government, under the name of Estado da India (State of India), with the conquest triggering compliance of neighbor kingdoms: Gujarat and Calicut sent embassies, offering alliances and grants to fortify. Albuquerque began that year in Goa the first Portuguese mint in India, taking the opportunity to announce the achievement.

==== Southeast Asia expeditions ====
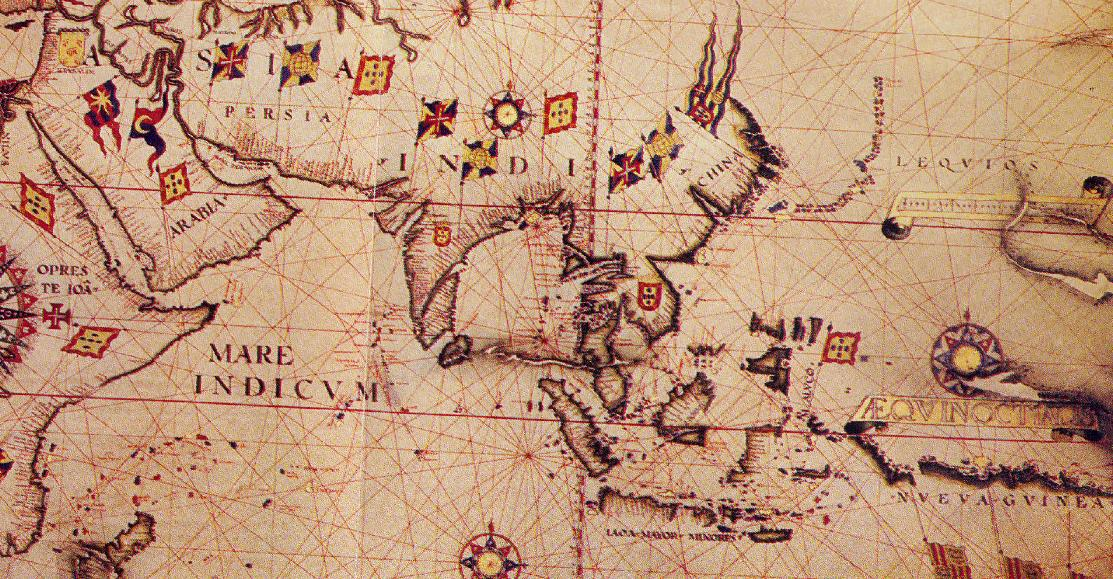
Anonymous map c.1550 of Eastern Africa, Asia and Western Oceania

In April 1511 Albuquerque sailed to Malacca in modern-day Malaysia, the most important eastern point in the trade network, where Malay met Gujarati, Chinese, Japanese, Javanese, Bengali, Persian and Arabic traders, described by Tomé Pires as invaluable. The port of Malacca became then the strategic base for Portuguese trade expansion with China and Southeast Asia, under the Portuguese rule in India with its capital at Goa. To defend the city a strong fort was erected, called the "A Famosa", where one of its gates still remains today. Learning of Siamese ambitions over Malacca, Albuquerque immediately sent Duarte Fernandes on a diplomatic mission to the kingdom of Siam (modern Thailand), where he was the first European to arrive, establishing amicable relations between the two kingdoms. In November that year, getting to know the location of the so-called "Spice Islands" in the Moluccas, Albuquerque sent an expedition to find them. Led by António de Abreu, the expedition arrived in early 1512. Abreu went by Ambon, while his deputy commander Francisco Serrão advanced to Ternate, where a Portuguese fort was allowed. That same year, in Indonesia, the Portuguese took Makassar, reaching Timor in 1514. Departing from Malacca, Jorge Álvares came to southern China in 1513. This visit followed the arrival in Guangzhou, where trade was established. Later a trading post at Macau would be established.

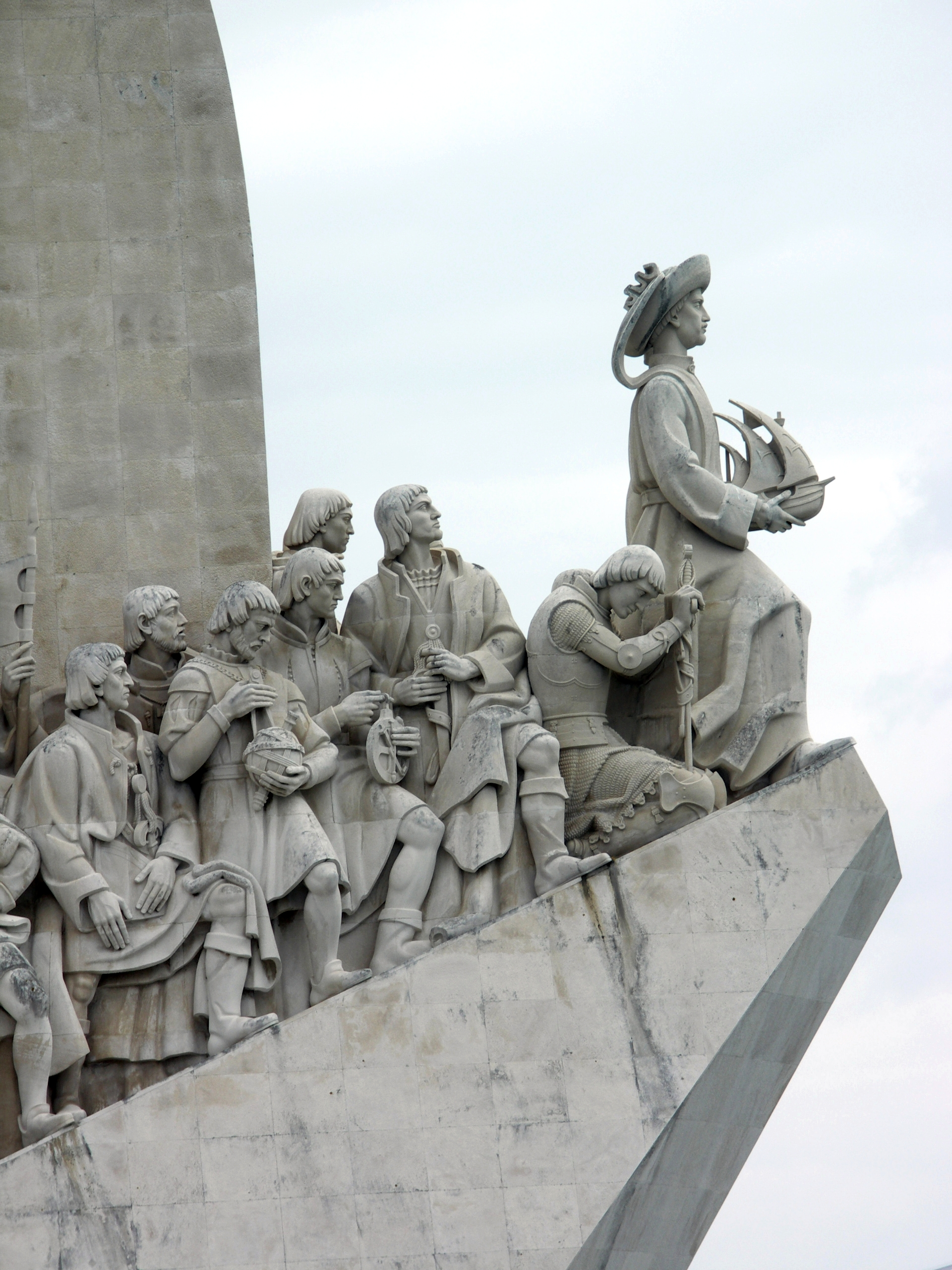
Monument to the Portuguese Discoveries in Belém, Lisbon, Portugal.

The Portuguese empire expanded into the Persian Gulf as Portugal contested control of the spice trade with the Ottoman Empire. In 1515, Afonso de Albuquerque conquered the Huwala state of Hormuz at the head of the Persian Gulf, establishing it as a vassal state. Aden, however, resisted Albuquerque's expedition in that same year, and another attempt by Albuquerque's successor Lopo Soares de Albergaria in 1516. Bahrain was captured in 1521, when a force led by António Correia defeated the Jabrid King, Muqrin ibn Zamil. In a shifting series of alliances, the Portuguese dominated much of the southern Persian Gulf for the next hundred years. The island of Mozambique became a strategic port on the regular maritime route linking Lisbon to Goa, and Fort São Sebastião and a hospital were built there. In the Azores, the Armada of the Islands protected ships from the Indies en route to Lisbon.

In 1525, after Fernão de Magalhães's expedition (1519–1522), Spain under Charles V sent an expedition to colonize the Moluccas islands, claiming that they were in his zone of the Treaty of Tordesillas, since there was not a set limit to the east. Led by García Jofre de Loaísa, the expedition reached the Moluccas, docking at Tidore. Conflict with the Portuguese already established in nearby Ternate was inevitable, starting nearly a decade of skirmishes. An agreement was reached only with the Treaty of Zaragoza (1529), which gave the Moluccas to Portugal and the Philippines to Spain.

In 1530, John III organized the colonization of Brazil around 15 capitanias hereditárias ("hereditary captainships"), that were given to anyone who wanted to administer and explore them, to overcome the need to defend the territory, since an expedition under the command of Gonçalo Coelho in 1503 had found the French making incursions on the land. That same year, there was a new expedition from Martim Afonso de Sousa with orders to patrol the whole Brazilian coast, banish the French, and create the first colonial towns: São Vicente on the coast, and São Paulo near the edge of the inland plateau (planalto) and the Serra do Mar. From the 15 original captainships, only two, Pernambuco and São Vicente, prospered. With permanent settlement came the establishment of the sugar cane industry and its intensive labor demands which were met with Native American and later African slaves.

In 1534, Gujarat was occupied by the Mughals and the Sultan Bahadur Shah of Gujarat was forced to sign the Treaty of Bassein (1534) with the Portuguese, establishing an alliance to regain the country, giving in exchange Daman, Diu, Mumbai, and Bassein. In 1538 the fortress of Diu was again surrounded by Ottoman ships. Another siege failed in 1547, putting an end to Ottoman ambitions and confirming Portuguese hegemony.

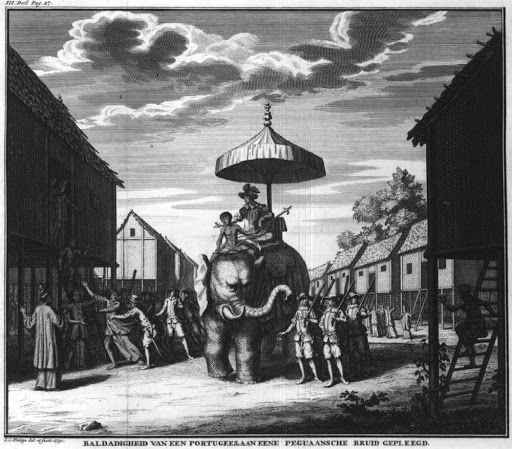
Portuguese ruler of Pegu riding an Elephant.

In 1542 Jesuit missionary Francis Xavier arrived in Goa at the service of King John III of Portugal, in charge of an Apostolic Nunciature. At the same time Francisco Zeimoto, António Mota, and other traders arrived in Japan for the first time. According to Fernão Mendes Pinto, who claimed to be in this journey, they arrived at Tanegashima, where the locals were impressed by European firearms, which would be immediately made by the Japanese on a large scale. In 1557 the Chinese authorities allowed the Portuguese to settle in Macau through an annual payment, creating a warehouse in the triangular trade between China, Japan and Europe. In 1570 the Portuguese bought a Japanese port where they founded the city of Nagasaki, thus creating a trading center that for many years was the port from Japan to the world.

Portugal established trading ports at far-flung locations like Goa, Ormuz, Malacca, Kochi, the Maluku Islands, Macau, and Nagasaki. Guarding its trade from both European and Asian competitors, Portugal dominated not only the trade between Asia and Europe, but also much of the trade between different regions of Asia, such as India, Indonesia, China, and Japan. Jesuit missionaries, such as the Francis Xavier, followed the Portuguese to spread Christianity to Asia with mixed success.

=== Cartographic history ===
==== Map of Portuguese exploration and discoveries (1415–1543) ====
Portuguese exploration and discoveries: first arrival places and dates; main Portuguese spice trade routes in the Indian Ocean (blue); territories claimed during the reign of King John III (c. 1536) (green); Main Factories (orange)

== Portuguese nautical science ==
Portuguese nautical science evolved from the successive expeditions and experience of the Portuguese pilots. It led to a fairly rapid evolution, creating an elite of astronomers, navigators, mathematicians and cartographers. Among them stood Pedro Nunes with studies on how to determine latitude by the stars, and João de Castro, who made important observations of magnetic declination over the entire route around Africa.

== Chronology ==
- 1147—Voyage of the Adventurers. Just before the siege of Lisbon by Afonso I of Portugal, a Muslim expedition left in search of legendary islands offshore. They were never heard from again.
- 1336—Possibly the first expedition to the Canary Islands with additional expeditions in 1340 and 1341, though this is disputed.
- 1412—Prince Henry, the Navigator orders the first expeditions to the African Coast and Canary Islands.
- 1415—Conquest of Ceuta (North Africa)
- 1419—João Gonçalves Zarco and Tristão Vaz Teixeira discovered Porto Santo island, in the Madeira group.
- 1420—The same sailors and Bartolomeu Perestrelo discovered the island of Madeira, which began to be colonized at once.
- 1422—Cape Nao, the limit of Moorish navigation, is passed as the African Coast is mapped.
- 1427—Diogo de Silves discovered the Azores, which was colonized in 1431 by Gonçalo Velho Cabral.
- 1434—Gil Eanes sailed round Cape Bojador, thus destroying the legends of the ‘Dark Sea’.
- 1434—the 32 point compass-card replaces the 12 points used until then.
- 1435—Gil Eanes and Afonso Gonçalves Baldaia discovered Garnet Bay (Angra dos Ruivos) and the latter reached the Gold River (Rio de Ouro).
- 1441—Nuno Tristão reached Cape Blanc.
- 1443—Nuno Tristão penetrated the Arguim Gulf. Prince Pedro granted Henry the Navigator the monopoly of navigation, war and trade in the lands south of Cape Bojador.
- 1444—Dinis Dias reached Cape Green (Cabo Verde).
- 1445—Álvaro Fernandes sailed beyond Cabo Verde and reached Cabo dos Mastros (Cape Naze).
- 1446—Álvaro Fernandes reached the northern Part of Portuguese Guinea (Guinea-Bissau).
- 1452—Diogo de Teive discovers the Islands of Flores and Corvo.
- 1455—Papal bull Romanus Pontifex confirmed the Portuguese explorations and declares that all lands and waters south of Bojador and cape Non (Cape Chaunar) belong to the kings of Portugal.
- 1456—Luis Cadamosto discovers the first Cape Verde Islands.
- 1458—Three capes discovered and named along the Grain Coast: (Grand Cape Mount, Cape Mesurado and Cape Palmas).
- 1460—Death of Prince Henry, the Navigator. His systematic mapping of the Atlantic, reached 8° N on the African Coast and 40° W in the Atlantic (Sargasso Sea) in his lifetime.
- 1461—Diogo Gomes and António de Noli discovered more of the Cape Verde Islands.
- 1461—Diogo Afonso discovered the western islands of the Cabo Verde group.
- 1471—João de Santarém and Pedro Escobar crossed the Equator. The southern hemisphere was discovered, requiring the sailor to use a new constellation to guide them, the Southern Cross. The discovery of the islands of São Tomé and Príncipe is also attributed to these same sailors.
- 1479—Treaty of Alcáçovas establishes Portuguese control of the Azores, Guinea, ElMina, Madeira and Cape Verde Islands and Castilian control of the Canary Islands.
- 1482—Diogo Cão reached the estuary of the Zaire (Congo) and placed a landmark there. Explored 150 km upriver to the Yellala Falls.
- 1484—Diogo Cão reached Walvis Bay, south of Namibia.
- 1487—Afonso de Paiva and Pero da Covilhã traveled overland from Lisbon in search of the Kingdom of Prester John (Ethiopia).
- 1488—Bartolomeu Dias, crowning 50 years of effort and methodical expeditions, rounded the Cape of Good Hope and entered the Indian Ocean. They had found the "Flat Mountain" of Ptolemy's Geography.
- 1489/92—South Atlantic Voyages to map the winds
- 1490—Columbus leaves for Spain after his father-in-law's death.
- 1492—First exploration of the Indian Ocean.
- 1494—The Treaty of Tordesillas between Portugal and Spain divided the world into two parts, Spain claiming all non-Christian lands west of a north–south line 370 leagues west of the Azores, Portugal claiming all non-Christian lands east of that line.
- 1495—Voyage of João Fernandes, the Farmer, and Pedro de Barcelos to Greenland. During their voyage they discovered the land to which they gave the name of Labrador (lavrador, farmer)
- 1494—First boats fitted with cannon doors and topsails.
- 1498—Vasco da Gama led the first fleet around Africa to India, arriving in Calicut.
- 1498—Duarte Pacheco Pereira explores the South Atlantic and the South American Coast North of the Amazon River.
- 1500—Pedro Álvares Cabral discovered Brazil on his way to India.
- 1500—Gaspar Corte-Real made his first voyage to Newfoundland, formerly known as Terras Corte-Real.
- 1500—Diogo Dias discovered an island they named after St Lawrence after the saint on whose feast day they had first sighted the island later known as Madagascar.
- 1502— Returning from India, Vasco da Gama discovers the Amirante Islands (Seychelles).
- 1502—Miguel Corte-Real set out for New England in search of his brother, Gaspar. João da Nova discovered Ascension Island. Fernão de Noronha discovered the island which still bears his name.
- 1503—On his return from the East, Estêvão da Gama discovered Saint Helena Island.
- 1505—Gonçalo Álvares in the fleet of the first viceroy sailed south in the Atlantic to were "water and even wine froze" discovering an island named after him, modern Gough Island.
- 1505—Lourenço de Almeida made the first Portuguese voyage to Ceylon (Sri Lanka) and established a settlement there.
- 1506—Tristão da Cunha discovered the island that bears his name. Portuguese sailors landed on Madagascar.
- 1509—The Bay of Bengal crossed by Diogo Lopes de Sequeira. On the crossing he also reached Malacca.
- 1511— Duarte Fernandes is the first European to visit the Kingdom of Siam (Thailand), sent by Afonso de Albuquerque after the conquest of Malaca.
- 1511–12 – João de Lisboa and Estevão de Fróis discovered the "Cape of Santa Maria" (Punta Del Este) in the River Plate, exploring its estuary (in present-day Uruguay and Argentina), and traveled as far south as the Gulf of San Matias at 42ºS (penetrating 300 km (186 mi) "around the Gulf"). Christopher de Haro, the financier of the expedition along with D. Nuno Manuel, bears witness of the news of the "White King" and "people of the mountains", the Inca empire – and the "axe of silver" (rio do "machado de prata") obtained from the Charrúa Indians and offered to king Manuel I.
- 1512— António de Abreu discovered Timor island and reached Banda Islands, Ambon Island and Seram. Francisco Serrão reached the Moluccas.
- 1512—Pedro Mascarenhas discover the island of Diego Garcia, he also encountered the Mauritius, although he may not have been the first to do so; expeditions by Diogo Dias and Afonso de Albuquerque in 1507 may have encountered the islands. In 1528 Diogo Rodrigues named the islands of Réunion, Mauritius, and Rodrigues the Mascarene Islands, after Mascarenhas.
- 1513—The first European trading ship to touch the coasts of China, under Jorge Álvares and Rafael Perestrello later in the same year.
- 1514–1531— António Fernandes's voyage and discoveries in 1514–1515, Sancho de Tovar from 1515 onwards, and Vicente Pegado (1531), among others, in several expeditions and contacts, are the first Europeans ever to contemplate and to describe the ruins of Great Zimbabwe and those regions (then referred to by the Portuguese as Monomotapa).
- 1517—Fernão Pires de Andrade and Tomé Pires were chosen by Manuel I of Portugal to sail to China to formally open relations between the Portuguese Empire and the Ming Dynasty during the reign of the Zhengde Emperor.
- 1519–1521—Fernão de Magalhães's expedition at the service of the King Charles I of Spain and German "Holy Roman" Emperor, in search of a westward route to the "Spice Islands" (Maluku Islands) became the first known expedition to sail from the Atlantic Ocean into the Pacific Ocean (then named "peaceful sea" by Magellan; the passage being made via the Strait of Magellan), and the first to cross the Pacific. Besides Magellan, also participated in the trip Diogo and Duarte Barbosa, João Serrão, Álvaro de Mesquita (Magellan's nephew), the pilots João Rodrigues de Carvalho and Estêvão Gomes, Henrique of Malacca, among others. Many of them cross almost all longitudes or all longitudes reaching the Philippines, Borneo and the Moluccas, because they had previously visited India, Mallacca, the Indonesian Archipelago or the Moluccas (1511–1512), like Ferdinand Magellan in the 7th Portuguese India Armada under the command of Francisco de Almeida and on the expeditions of Diogo Lopes de Sequeira, Afonso de Albuquerque and his other voyages, sailing eastward from Lisbon (as Magellan in 1505), and then later, in 1521, sailing westward from Seville, reaching that longitude and region once again and then proceeding still further west.
- 1525—Aleixo Garcia explored the Rio de la Plata in service to Spain as a member of the expedition of Juan Díaz de Solís in 1516. Solís had left Portugal towards Castile (Spain) in 1506 and would be financed by Christopher de Haro, who had served Manuel I of Portugal until 1516. Serving Charles I of Spain after 1516, Haro believed that Lisboa and Frois had discovered a major route in the Southern New World to west or a strait to Asia two years earlier. Later (when returning and after a shipwreck on the coast of Brazil), from Santa Catarina, Brazil, and leading an expedition of some European and 2,000 Guaraní Indians, Aleixo Garcia explored Paraguay and Bolivia using the trail network Peabiru. Aleixo Garcia was the first European to cross the Chaco and even managed to penetrate the outer defenses of the Inca Empire on the hills of the Andes (near Sucre), in present-day Bolivia. He was the first European to do so, accomplishing this eight years before Francisco Pizarro.
- 1525—Diogo da Rocha and his pilot Gomes de Sequeira reached Celebes and were blown off course and driven three hundred leagues in a direction constantly towards the east and to Ilhas de Gomes de Sequeira – most probably the Palau Island or Yap, (Caroline Islands) according to the geographical notes, distance traveled and physical description of the natives in Décadas da Ásia of João de Barros, or, according to the alleged existence of gold mentioned by the natives, other descriptions of the people and if they were to south and east in one or two voyages made by Gomes de Sequeira (According to the different interpretations of the Chronicles of Barros, Castanheda and Galvão), raises also the hypothesis of Cape York Peninsula in Australia, maybe one of the Prince of Wales Islands. In Gastald's map a group of islands named Insul de gomes des queria lie in about 8 degrees of south latitude and in the longitude of the Northern Territory of Australia. In the same map the Apem insul seems to correspond with either Adi Island or the Aru Islands. The Ins des hobres blancos (Islands of the White Men) correspond, as far as locality is concerned, to the Arru (Aru) Islands. It would appear then that Gomes de Sequeira's Islands, which are the south-easternmost of those represented, must correspond with the Timor Laut group. In the same year, according to the voyages to the Banda Islands mentioned on Decadas and according to contemporaneous cartographers, Martim Afonso de Melo (Jusarte) and Garcia Henriques explored the Tanimbar Islands (the archipelago labelled "aqui invernou Martim Afonso de Melo" and "Aqui in bernon Martin Afonso de melo" [Here wintered Martin Afonso de Melo]) and probably the Aru Islands (the two archipelagos and the navigator mentioned in the maps of Lázaro Luís, 1563, Bartolomeu Velho, c. 1560, Sebastião Lopes, c. 1565 and also in the 1594 map of the East Indies entitled Insulce Molucoe by the Dutch cartographer Petrus Plancius and in the map of Nova Guinea of 1600).
- 1526—Discovery of New Guinea by Jorge de Meneses
- 1528—Diogo Rodrigues explores the Mascarene islands, that he names after his countryman Pedro Mascarenhas, he explored and named the islands of Réunion, Mauritius, and Rodrigues
- 1529—Treaty of Saragossa divides the eastern hemisphere between Spain and Portugal, stipulating that the dividing line should lie 297.5 leagues or 17° east of the Moluccas.
- 1542–43—Fernão Mendes Pinto, António Mota and Francisco Zeimoto reached Japan.
- 1542—The coast of California explored by João Rodrigues Cabrilho on behalf of Spain.
- 1557—Macau given to Portugal by the Emperor of China as a reward for services rendered against the pirates who infested the South China Sea.
- 1559—The Nau São Paulo commanded by Rui Melo da Câmara (was part of the Portuguese India Armada commanded by Jorge de Sousa) discovered Île Saint-Paul in the South Indian Ocean. The island was mapped, described and painted by members of the crew, among them the Father Manuel Álvares and the chemist Henrique Dias (Álvares and Dias calculated the correct latitude 38° South at the time of discovery). The Nau São Paulo, who also carried women and had sailed from Europe and had scale in Brazil, would be the protagonist of a dramatic and moving story of survival after sinking south of Sumatra.
- 1560—Gonçalo da Silveira, Jesuit missionary, travelled up the Zambezi River, on his expedition to the capital of the Monomotapa which appears to have been the N'Pande kraal, close by the M'Zingesi River, a southern tributary of the Zambezi. He arrived there on 26 December 1560.
- 1586—António da Madalena, a Capuchin friar, was one of the first Western visitors to Angkor (now Cambodia).
- 1602–1606—Bento de Góis, a Jesuit missionary, was the first known European to travel overland from India to China, via Afghanistan and the Pamirs.
- 1606—Pedro Fernandes de Queirós discovered Henderson Island, the Ducie Island and the islands later called the New Hebrides and now the nation of Vanuatu. Queirós landed on a large island which he took to be part of the southern continent, and named it La Austrialia del Espiritu Santo (The Australian Land of the Holy Spirit), for King Philip III(II), or Australia of the Holy Spirit (Australia do Espírito Santo) of the southern continent.
- 1626—Estêvão Cacella, Jesuit missionary, traveled through the Himalayas and was the first European to enter Bhutan.
- 1636–1638—Pedro Teixeira went from Belém do Pará up the Amazon River and reached Quito, Ecuador, in an expedition of over a thousand men. So Teixeira's expedition became the first simultaneously to travel up and down the Amazon River.
- 1648–1651—António Raposo Tavares with 200 whites from São Paulo and over a thousand Indians travelled for over 10,000 kilometres (6,200 mi), in the biggest expedition ever made in the Americas, following the courses of the rivers, most notably the Paraguay River, to the Andes, the Grande River, the Mamoré River, the Madeira River and the Amazon River. Only Tavares, 59 whites and some Indians reached Belém at the mouth of the Amazon River.
