= Kalapa =

City of Kalapa

Kalapa, according to Buddhist legend, is the capital city of the Kingdom of Shambhala ,The city is described as exceptionally beautiful, featuring a sandalwood pleasure grove and a vast three-dimensional Kalachakra mandala attributed to King Suchandra.

Kalapa Court, the palace of the king, stands on a platform of pearl in the center. The building is nine stories high. The roof and floor of the king's chamber consist of crystal plants that radiate heat for warmth. The city is shaped like a square and surrounded by walls made of ruby. There are four gates for entry made of precious stones. There are 31 pavilions each of which is surrounded by gardens and streams.

There are two half-moon-shaped lakes on two sides of Kalapa.
