= Fernão Mendes Pinto =

Portuguese explorer and writer

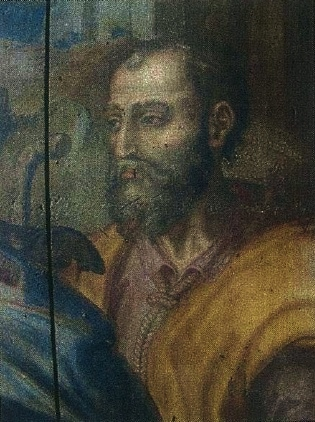
- Possible likeness of Fernão Mendes Pinto in the Visitation altarpiece (Giraldo Fernandes de Prado, 1589–1591) of the Church of Misericórdia of Almada, Portugal
- Born: 1509; Montemor-o-Velho, Kingdom of Portugal
- Died: 8 July 1583; Pragal, Almada, Kingdom of Portugal
- Occupations: Explorer and writer
- Known for: Pilgrimage

Fernão Mendes Pinto (Portuguese pronunciation: [fɨɾˈnɐ̃w ˈmẽdɨʃ ˈpĩtu]; c. 1509 – 8 July 1583) was a Portuguese explorer and writer. His voyages are recorded in Pilgrimage (Portuguese: Peregrinação), his autobiographical memoir, which was published posthumously in 1614. The historical accuracy of the work is debatable due to the many events that seem far-fetched or at least exaggerated, earning him the nickname Fernão Mentes Minto (wordplay with the Portuguese verb mentir, 'to lie', meaning "Fernão, are you lying? I am lying."). Still, many aspects of the work can be verified, particularly through records of Pinto's service to the Portuguese crown and by his association with Jesuit missionaries.

== Early life ==
Pinto was born in about 1509, in Montemor-o-Velho, Portugal, to a poor rural family or perhaps to a family of minor nobility who had fallen on hard times. Pinto had two brothers and two sisters (and possibly other siblings). In 1551, a brother, Álvaro, was recorded in Portuguese Malacca. Letters also record that a brother died a martyr in Malacca. In 1557, Francisco Garcia de Vargas, Pinto's wealthy cousin, is recorded at Cochin.

He was related to the wealthy Mendes family, who were descendants of Jewish Marranos who lived in Portugal (which makes him a relative of the Jewish philanthropist Gracia Mendes Nasi). They had a monopoly on black pepper commerce in Portugal and some of them later moved to Antwerp in Belgium.

Pinto described his childhood as spartan. In 1521, hoping to improve the boy's prospects, an uncle took him to Lisbon. There, Pinto was employed in the household service of a noblewoman. After eighteen months or so, Pinto fled. At the docks, he was hired as a ship's boy on a cargo vessel bound for Setúbal. On the way, French pirates captured the ship and the passengers were set upon the shore at Alentejo.

Pinto eventually made his way to Setúbal, where he entered the service of Francisco de Faria, a knight of Santiago. He remained there for four years and then joined the service of Jorge de Lencastre, a master of the Order of Santiago and an illegitimate son of King John II of Portugal. Pinto held that position for a number of years. Although comfortable, it held no promise of advancement. Therefore, at twenty-eight, Pinto left to join the Portuguese India Armadas.

== Voyages ==
Pinto's travels can be divided into three phases: firstly, from Portugal to India; secondly, through the region of the Red Sea, from the coast of Africa to the Persian Gulf; and thirdly, from east India to Sumatra, Siam, China, and Japan. Finally, Pinto returned to Europe.

=== First voyage to India ===
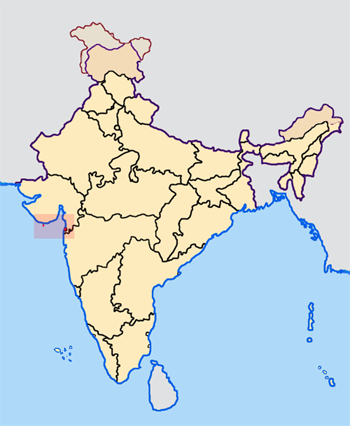
Map of India showing Diu

On 11 March 1537, Pinto left Lisbon for India via Portuguese Mozambique. On 5 September that year, he arrived in Diu, a fortified island and town northwest of Bombay (Portuguese since 1535 but under siege by Suleiman the Magnificent).

Pinto then joined a Portuguese reconnaissance mission to the Red Sea via Ethiopia. The mission was to deliver a message to Portuguese soldiers guarding the mother of "Prester John" (Emperor Dawit II of Ethiopia) in a mountain fortress. After leaving Massawa, the mission engaged three Turkish galleys in battle. The Portuguese ships were defeated and their crews taken to Mokha to be sold as slaves.

Pinto was sold to a Greek Muslim who was a cruel master. Pinto threatened suicide and was sold to a Jewish merchant for about thirty ducats' worth of dates. With the Jewish merchant, Pinto travelled the caravan route to Hormuz, a leading market town in the Persian Gulf. There, Pinto was freed by way of payment of three hundred ducats from the Portuguese crown. He was made captain of the Fortress of Hormuz and the Portuguese king's special magistrate for Indian affairs.

=== Second voyage to India ===
Soon after being freed, Pinto sailed on a Portuguese cargo ship to Goa. Against his will, Pinto was transferred en route to a naval fleet bound for the Mughal port city of Debal (modern Karachi) near Thatta. After enduring battles with Ottoman ships, Pinto reached Goa.

=== Malacca and the Far East ===
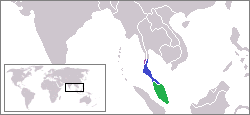
Malay Peninsula

From 1539, Pinto remained in Malacca under Pedro de Faria, the newly appointed captain of Malacca. Pinto was sent to establish diplomatic contacts, particularly with small kingdoms allied with the Portuguese against the Muslims of northern Sumatra. In 1569, he discovered an Ottoman fleet led by Kurtoğlu Hızır Reis in Aceh.

==== Patani ====
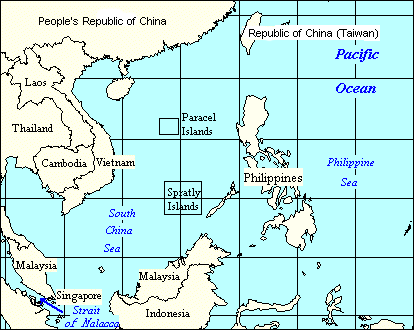
South China Sea

Following Pinto's mission to Sumatra, he was sent to Patani, on the eastern shore of the Malay Peninsula. From there, Pinto made an unsuccessful delivery of merchandise to Siam. The goods were stolen by pirates who were then chased by Pinto and António de Faria. Pinto continued trading operations in the South China Sea, especially in the Gulf of Tonkin.

==== China ====
Pinto entered China from the Yellow Sea and raided a tomb of the Emperor of China. Pinto was shipwrecked, apprehended by the Chinese and sentenced to one year hard labour on the Great Wall of China. Before completing his sentence, Pinto was taken prisoner by invading Tatars. He became an agent of the Tartars and travelled with them to Cochinchina, the southernmost part of modern-day Cambodia and Vietnam. Pinto describes his encounter with a "pope-like" man, possibly the Dalai Lama, who had never heard of Europe. Pinto and two companions jumped ship to a Chinese pirate junk and were shipwrecked onto the Japanese island of Tanegashima, south of Kyūshū.

==== Japan ====
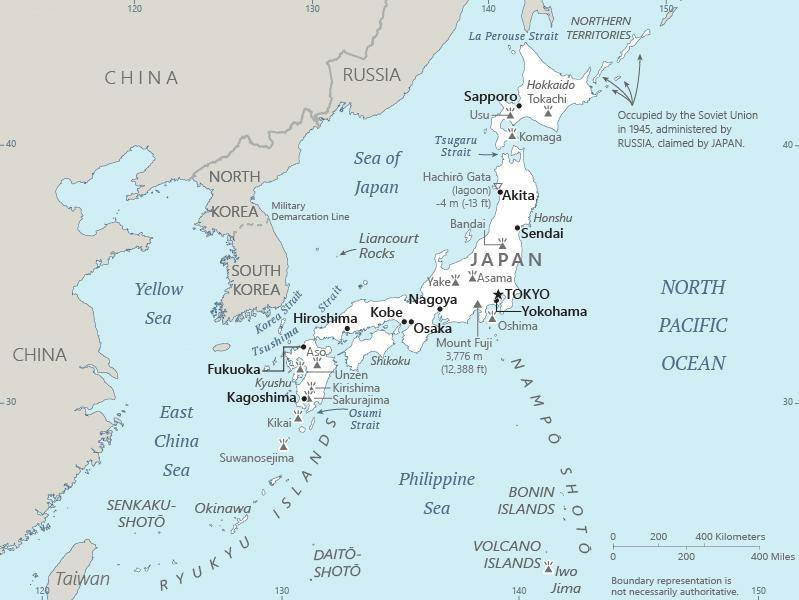
Japan

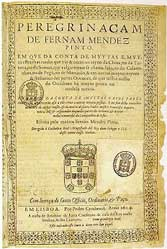
Peregrinação, Pinto's famous book

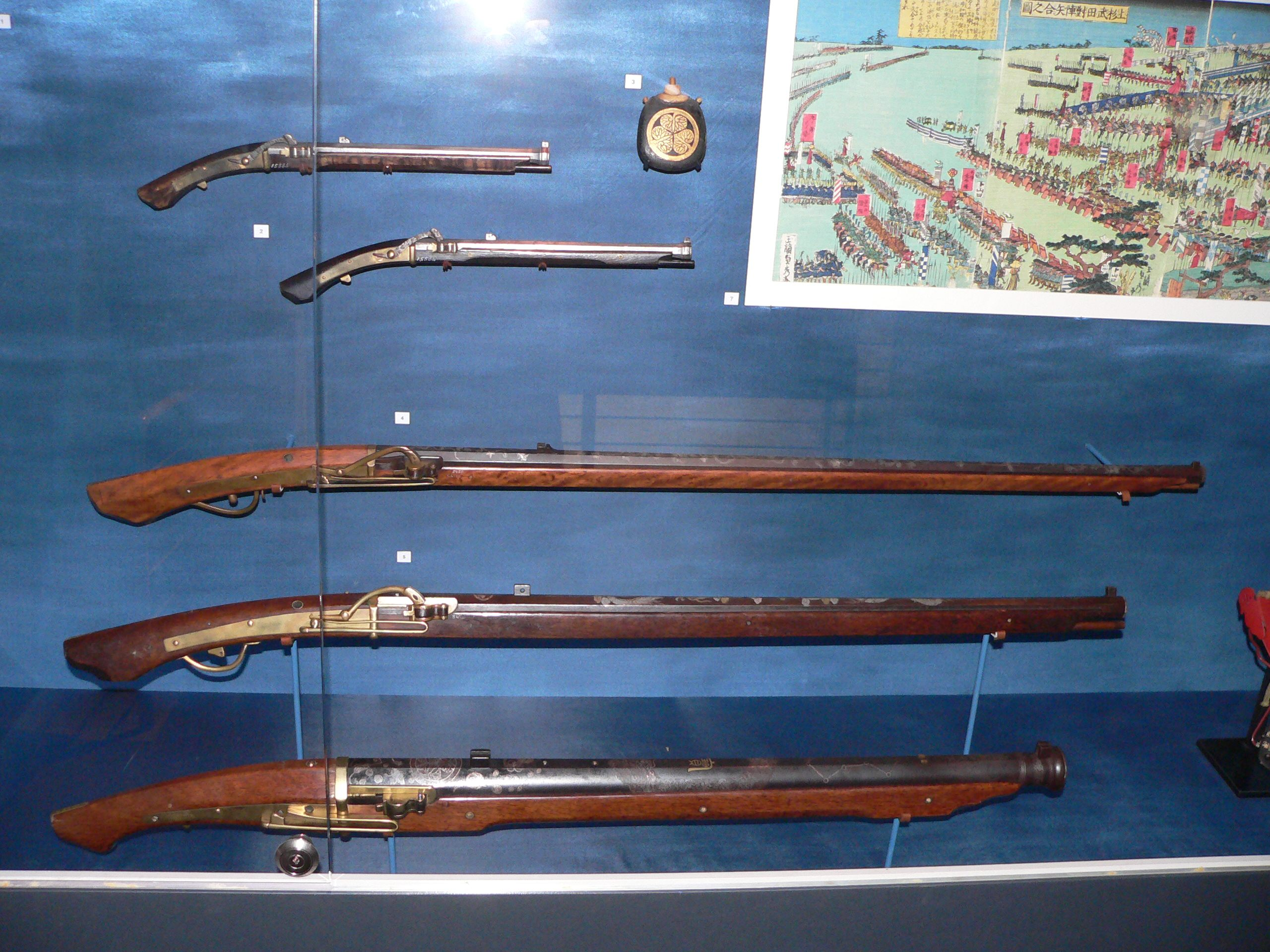
Japanese arquebus (teppo) used in the Sengoku through the Edo periods

Pinto claimed that his 1543 landing made him the first European to set foot in Japan. He also claimed to have introduced the arquebus to Japan. It is widely accepted now, however, that several Portuguese traders, including António Mota and Francisco Zeimoto, visited Japan a year earlier. The firearm was reproduced and used in the Japanese civil wars. It was known as the tanegashima.

Pinto facilitated trade between the Portuguese and Japan. At one point, he was shipwrecked on the Ryukyu Islands. Pinto proposed a conquest of the Ryukyu Kingdom in his memoirs, opining that the Portuguese could exploit the kingdom's sugar and mineral resources, but no such project ever materialized. In 1549, Pinto left Kagoshima accompanied by a Japanese fugitive, Anjirō. He returned to Japan with Saint Francis Xavier, a Catholic missionary. In 1554, Pinto joined the Society of Jesus and donated a large sum of his trading wealth to the mission. In a letter, Ōtomo Yoshishige, daimyō of Bungo, offered his conversion and requested Pinto return to Japan. The letter arrived at the same time that Xavier's body was being displayed in Goa. Ōtomo did not convert at that time due to internal difficulties but did so later at the time Pinto was completing his autobiography. Between 1554 and 1556, Pinto returned to Japan with Xavier's successor. He became the Viceroy of Portuguese India's ambassador to the daimyo of Bungo on the island of Kyūshū. Despite Pinto's support of the Church in Japan, he left the Jesuits in 1557.

==== Martaban ====
Pinto returned to Malacca and was sent to Mottama in Toungoo Burma. He arrived during a siege and took refuge in a Portuguese camp of mercenaries who had betrayed the Viceroy. Pinto was betrayed by a mercenary, captured by Burmese forces, and placed under the charge of the king's treasurer, who took him to the kingdom of Calaminham. Pinto fled to Goa.

==== Java ====
On Pinto's return to Goa, Faria sent him to Bantam, Java, to buy pepper for sale to China. Once again, Pinto was shipwrecked. He may have resorted to cannibalism before submitting to slavery in order to secure passage out of the swampy Java shore. Pinto was bought by a Celebes merchant and resold to the King of Kalapa who returned him to Sunda.

==== Siam ====
Using borrowed money, Pinto bought passage to Siam where he encountered the King of Siam at war. Pinto's writings contribute to the historical record of the war.

=== Return to Portugal ===
On 22 September 1558, Pinto returned to Portugal. Fame preceded him in Western Europe due to one of his letters being published by the Society of Jesus in 1555. Pinto spent the years 1562–1566 in court looking for reward or compensation for his years of service to the Crown. He married Maria Correia Barreto with whom he had at least two daughters. In 1562, he purchased a farm in Pragal. Pinto died on 8 July 1583 at his farm.

== Memoir Peregrinação ==
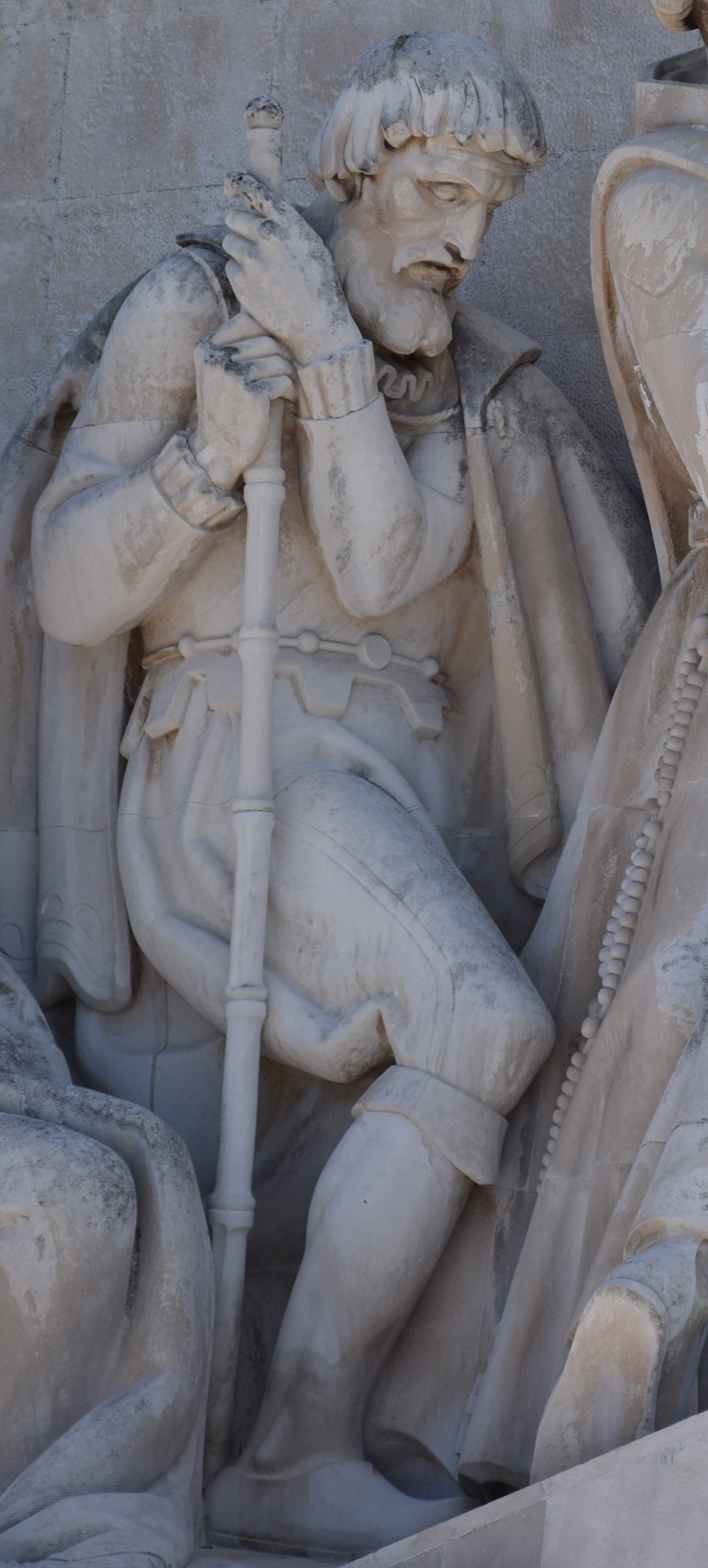
Statue of Fernão Mendes Pinto in Monument of the Discoveries, Lisbon

Pinto began his memoirs in 1569. The book was published posthumously by friar Belchior Faria in 1614. Although Pinto did not have the education of contemporary authors and did not reveal a knowledge of either classical culture nor aesthetics of the Renaissance, his experiential knowledge and intelligence enabled him to create a meaningful work. Pinto was critical of Portuguese colonialism in the Far East.

The tales of his wanderings were so incredible and far-fetched as to not be believed. They gave rise to the saying "Fernão, Mentes? Minto!", a Portuguese pun on his name meaning "Fernão, do you lie? I do!"

The publication may vary from Pinto's manuscript (some sentences are erased and others are edited). The disappearance of references to the Society of Jesus, one of the most active religious orders in the Orient, is notable, as there are clear indications of Pinto's relationship with the society. Pinto's memoirs are just that, his memories of events, giving rise to doubts regarding historical accuracy. However, it documents the impact of the Asian civilizations on the Europeans and is a reasonable analysis of Portuguese action in the Orient (in comparison to Luís de Camões' Os Lusíadas).

The most controversial of Pinto's claims is his being the first European to visit Japan and his introduction of the arquebus to Japan. Another controversial claim, that he fought in Java against the Muslims, has been analyzed by historians. The Dutch historian, P. A. Tiele, who wrote in 1880, did not believe Pinto was present during the campaign, but rather that he wrote his information from secondhand sources. Even so, Tiele admits Pinto's account cannot be disregarded because of the lack of alternative information about Javanese history during the time. Maurice Collis holds the opinion that Pinto's accounts, while not entirely true, remain compatible with historical events. Collis considers Pinto's work the most complete European account of 16th century Asian history.

== Legacy ==
In 1978, a crater on Mercury was named Mendes Pinto after Pinto.

A high school in Almada, Portugal, built in 1965, was named in his honour and in 2011, a 2 euro coin was issued to mark the 500th anniversary of Pinto's birthday.

In March 2026, a bronze replica of a statue of Fernão Mendes Pinto was unveiled in the city of Hiji, Oita Prefecture, Japan.

== See also ==
- Exploration of Asia

== Sources ==
- Breve História da Literatura Portuguesa, Texto Editora, Lisboa, 1999
- A. J. Barreiros, História da Literatura Portuguesa, Editora Pax, eleventh edition.
- A. J. Saraiva, O. Lopes, História da Literatura Portuguesa, Porto Editora, twelfth edition.
- Enciclopédia Luso-Brasileira de Cultura, Editorial Verbo, Lisboa, Fifteenth edition.
- Lexicoteca – Moderna Enciclopédia Universal volume 15 Círculo de Leitores, 1987
- The Travels of Mendes Pinto, Edited and translated by Rebecca D. Catz, The University of Chicago Press, ISBN 0-226-66951-3
- Collis, M. The Grand Peregrination Faber and Faber 1949 ISBN 0-85635-850-9
- Fernão Mendes Pinto and the Peregrinação – studies, restored Portuguese text, notes and indexes, directed by Jorge Santos Alves, Fundação Oriente, Lisbon, 2010, ISBN 978-972-785-096-9

=== Online ===
Rebecca Catz. "Hispania". Fernão Mendes Pinto and His Peregrinação.
