= António Mota =

Portuguese explorer (fl. 1543)

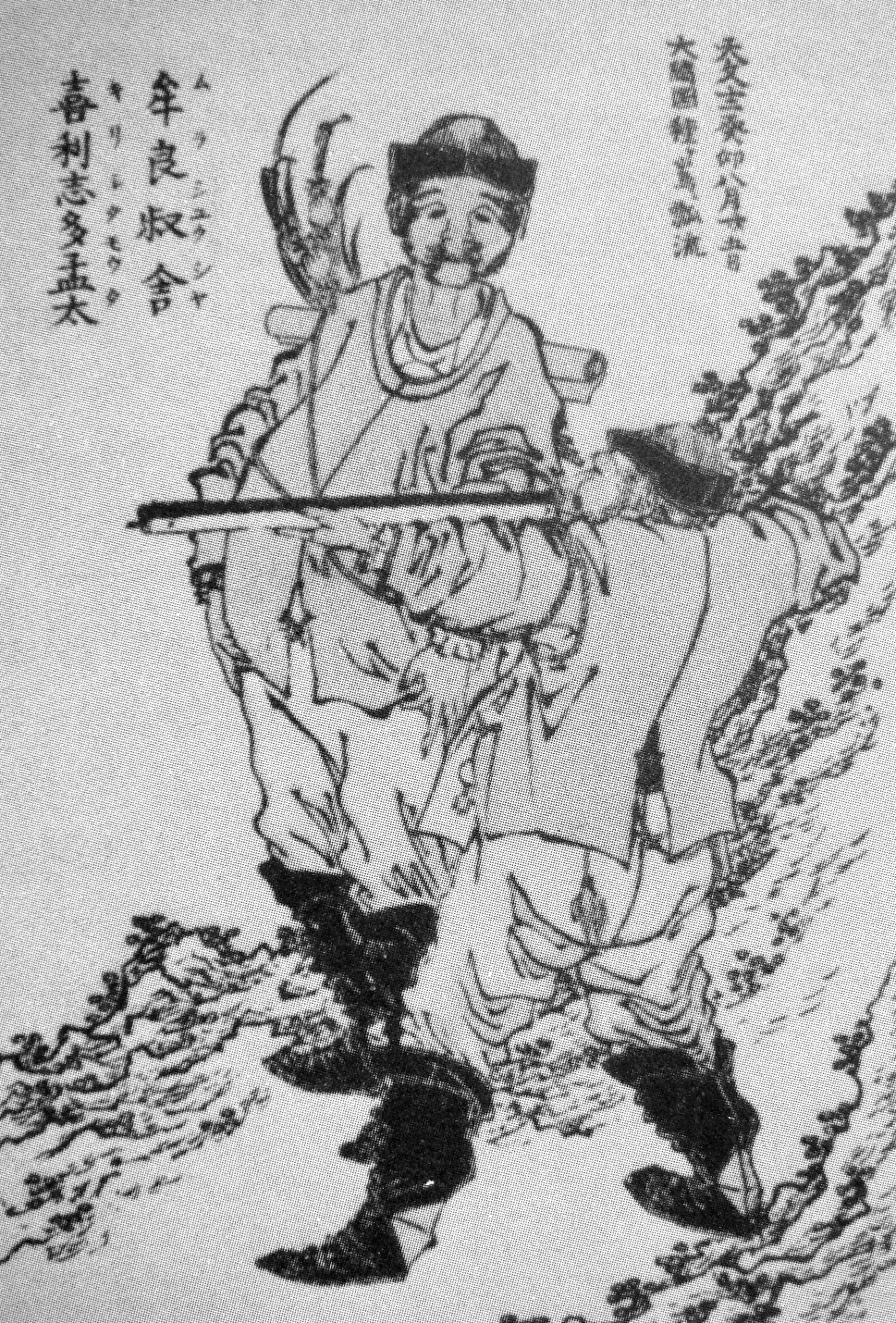
- António da Mota demonstrating the use of gun to the Japanese
- Born: Kingdom of Portugal
- Died: Unknown
- Occupations: Trader, Explorer

António da Mota was a Portuguese trader and explorer who, in 1543, together with Fernão Mendes Pinto and Francisco Zeimoto, became one of the first Europeans to set foot in Japan.

== Voyage ==
While traveling to Ningbo with a Chinese junk in 1543 (some sources say 1542), Mota and the rest of the crew were swept off course by a bad storm. Among the crew were around 100 East Asians and several Portuguese. The Portuguese included were Francisco Zeimoto, António Peixoto, and Mota himself. Fernão Mendes Pinto claimed that he was on the voyage as well, but this claim is unlikely since he also claimed (more accurately) that he was in Burma at the same time.

Driven off course by the storm, the ship landed on the island of Tanegashima on 25 August 1543. António da Mota and Francisco Zeimoto are recognized as the first Europeans on Japanese soil. António Peixoto is not recorded as having landed, and presumably died at sea before the landing.

Mota and Zeimoto introduced handheld guns to Japan, which the Japanese found fascinating. In the decades that followed, the Japanese invested heavily in the mass production of firearms. The ship was then soon repaired and António da Mota departed from Japan. The rest of his life is unknown.

== See also ==
- Japan-Portugal relations
- Nanban trade
- Portuguese discoveries
- Tanegashima (Japanese matchlock)
- Portuguese Nagasaki
