= King Chandrasena =

King of Haihayas kingdom

Raja Chandrasena (Sanskrit: चन्द्रसेन; also known as Soma Raja or सोमराज) was a king of an ancient Haihayas dynasty who ruled the Ujjain kingdom. Chandrasena was the descendent of Kartavirya Arjuna, king of the Haihayas and a devotee of Shiva.

== Mahakaleshwar temple ==
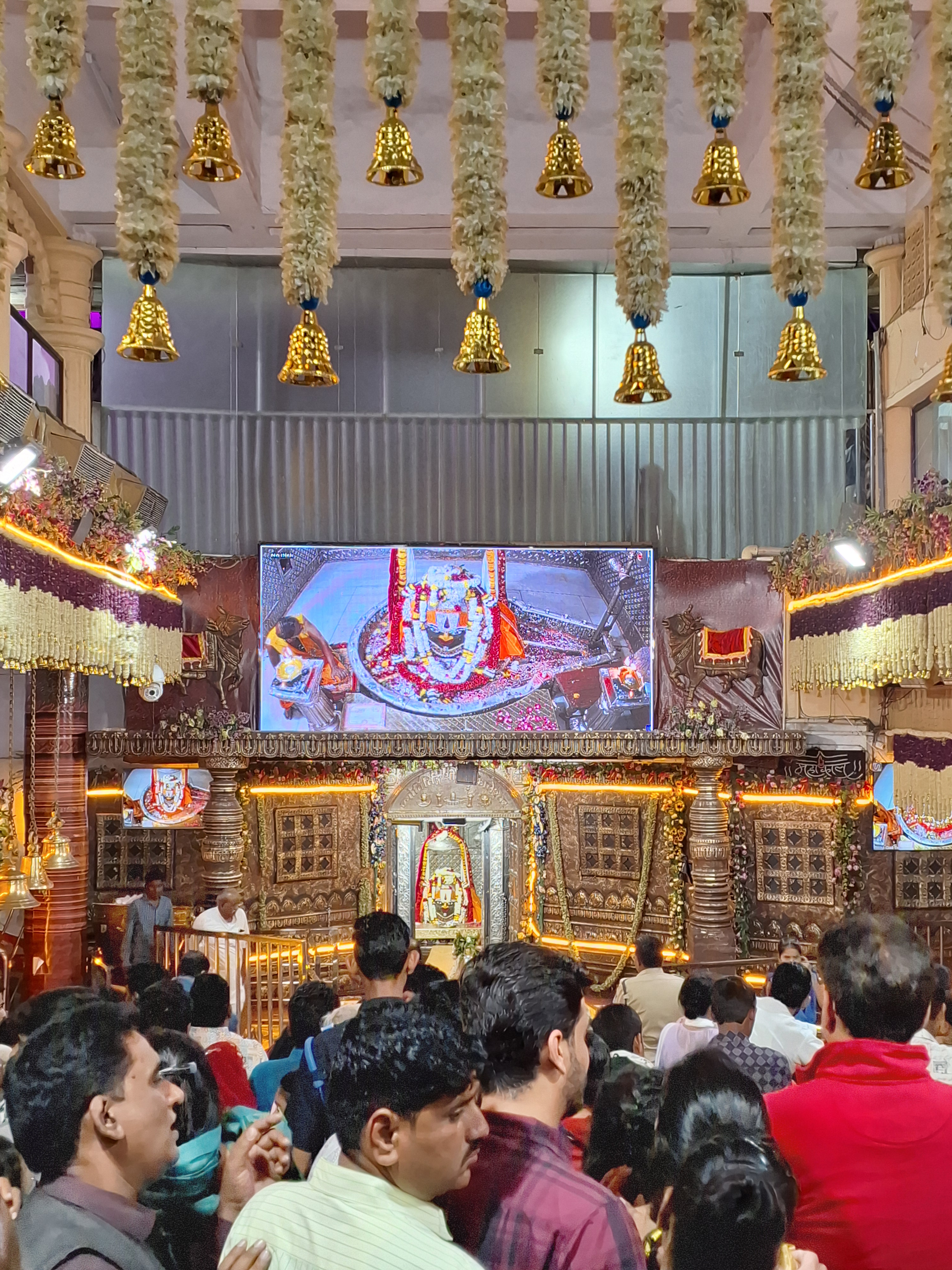
Mahakaleshwar Ujjain

According to legend, Chandrasena ruled Ujjain and was a devotee of Shiva, who appeared in his Mahakal form and destroyed the enemies of the king. Upon the request of his devotees, Shiva agreed to reside in the city and become its chief deity.

Chandrasena was an intellectual and a dedicated follower of Shiva. One day, his friend Maheswari's disciple Manibahdra gifted him a stunning gemstone known as Sundara Chintamani. It glimmered so brightly and beautifully when Chandrasena wore it around his neck that he appeared more magnificent than the divine gods. On one occasion, several kings approached Chandrasena, requesting that he relinquish the gem, but he declined their request. This infuriated the kings, prompting them to attack Chandrasena's realm. Upon realizing that he was encircled by the adversaries, Chandrasena sought the assistance of Mahakal. Shiva was gratified by his prayers and presented him with a solution.

An uneducated boy once spotted the king conducting Puja at the stone and placed it in his vacant home. He believed it to be a manifestation of Shiva and began to venerate it. The boy became so absorbed in prayers and chants that he completely forgot about food. When his mother came to summon him, no amount of calling affected him. He was engaged in silent prayer. Incensed by this, the mother, who was still tethered by worldly affection, discarded the Siva Linga. She eliminated all items of worship. The boy felt profound over his mother's actions. He devoted himself entirely to praying to Shiva, and Shiva came to his aid.

This stone Siva Linga, brought by the son of a cowherd, quickly became adorned with jewels and transformed into a Jyotirlinga. After singing praises to Shiva, when the boy returned home, he was astonished to discover a magnificent palatial dwelling in its place. Thus, due to the blessings of Shiva, the boy became wealthy and lived a joyful life.

Meanwhile, the enemy kings who had attacked Chandrasena's empire began to quarrel among themselves. They started proclaiming that King Chandrasena is a devotee of Siva and that Ujjain itself is the city of Mahakal. Therefore, it was deemed impossible for anyone to conquer it. They then chose to extend an olive branch to Chandrasena, and together they all worshipped Mahakal.

== Descendants ==
The descendants of Raja Chandrasen were called Chandrasena Kayasthas. They successfully ruled Kashmir for a long period. They were later known as Chandraseniya Kayasths, and their subjects addressed them as prabhu (master) with love and respect.
