= Francisco Zeimoto =

Portuguese explorer and trader

- Born: Kingdom of Portugal
- Died: Unknown
- Occupations: Trader, Explorer

Francisco Zeimoto was a Portuguese trader and mariner of the 16th century, renowned for his significant role in early European contact with Japan. Born in Portugal, Zeimoto embarked on daring sea voyages in pursuit of lucrative trade opportunities in the flourishing Asian markets.

In 1543, Zeimoto, alongside his compatriot António da Mota, achieved an historic feat by becoming the first Europeans to arrive to Japan. Their voyage, initially bound for Ningbo, China, took a dramatic turn when they encountered a storm that diverted their course.

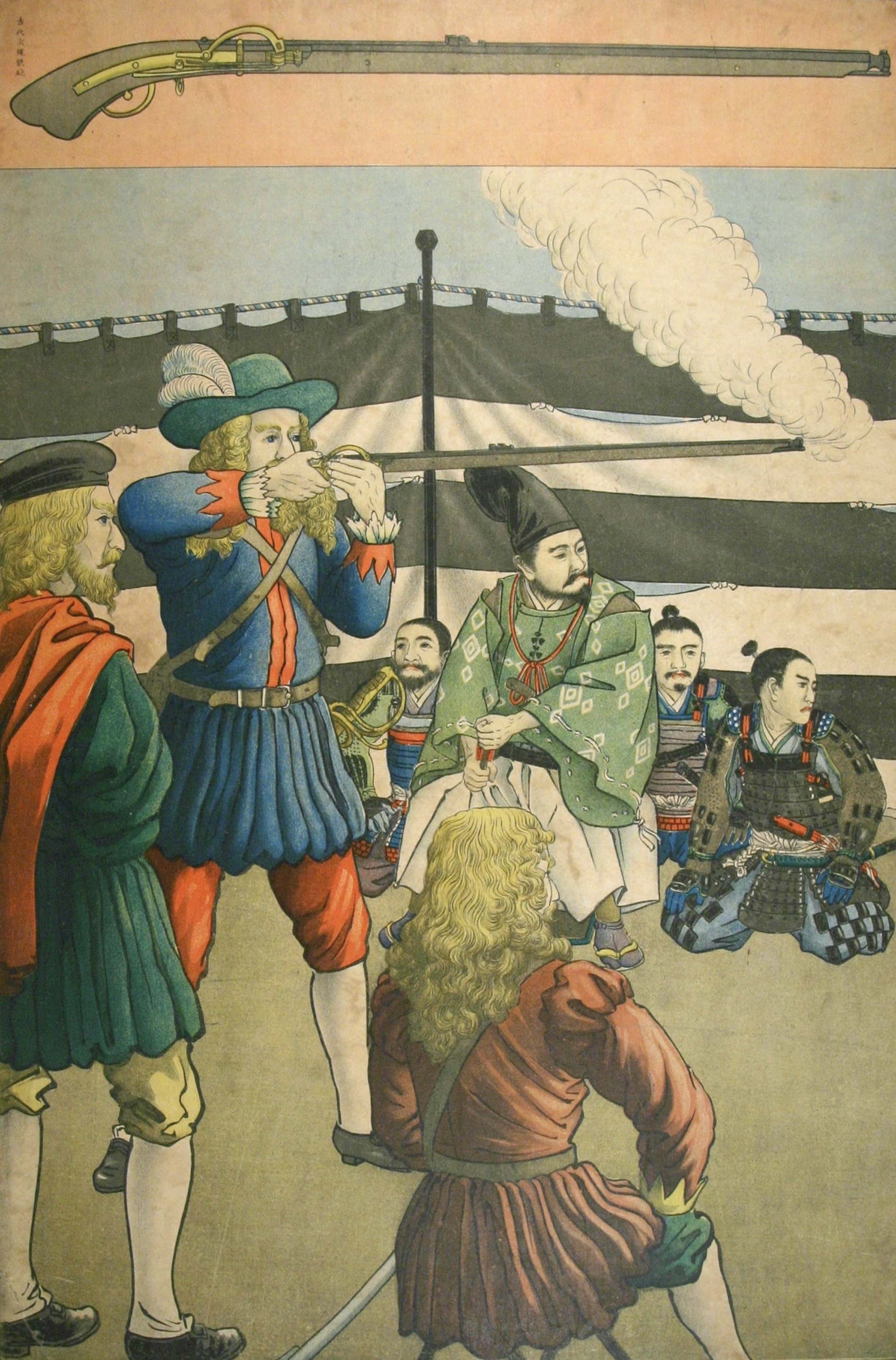
Illustration of the introduction of firearms in Japan

Upon reaching land, they found themselves on the shores of Japan, where they encountered locals whom they initially believed to be Chinese.

Zeimoto's expeditions to Portuguese colonies in Asia were fuelled by the prospect of lucrative trade in spices, silks, and other exotic goods. Notably, Zeimoto's arrival in Japan marked a pivotal moment in the country's history, as it laid foundations for cultural exchange and trade relations with Japan.

Zeimoto is credited with introducing firearms, particularly the Portuguese arquebus, to the Japanese archipelago, forever altering the dynamics of warfare and technology in the region.

Today, Zeimoto and his companions are commemorated annually during the Tanegashima Gun Festival, a testament to their historic arrival on the island of Tanegashima.

== See also ==
- Japan-Portugal relations
- Nanban trade
- Portuguese discoveries
- Tanegashima (Japanese matchlock)
- Portuguese Nagasaki
