= Portuguese presence in Asia =

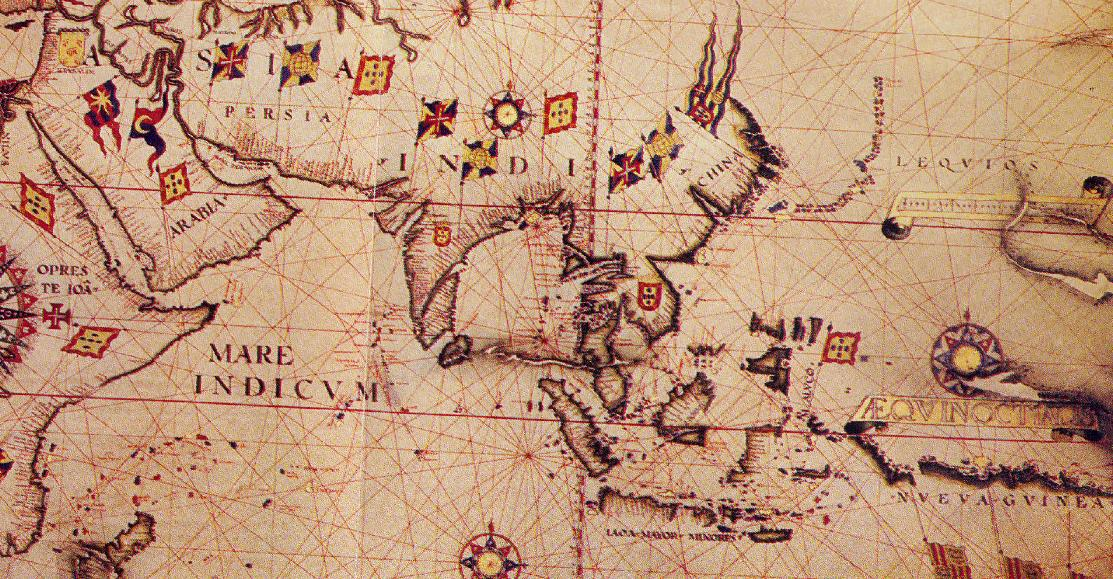
Map of Asia and Oceania c. 1550

The Portuguese presence in Asia was responsible for what would be the first of many contacts between European countries and the East, starting on May 20, 1498 with the trip led by Vasco da Gama to Calicut, India (in modern-day Kerala state in India). Aside from being part of the European colonisation of Southeast Asia in the 16th century, Portugal's goal in the Indian Ocean was to ensure their monopoly in the spice trade, establishing several fortresses and commercial trading posts.

== Background ==
The inaccuracy of geographical knowledge before the discoveries led people to believe that Asia lay at the beginning of the Nile River and not the Red Sea, allowing the inclusion of Ethiopia in Asia and the extension of the word India to incorporate these and other parts of Eastern Africa. Here, according to an old legend, lived a Christian emperor, wealthy and powerful, known as Prester John.

The name Prester John seems to derive from zan hoy (my master), an Ethiopian term used by the population designating its king. In the fifteenth century, Prester John was identified with the king of Ethiopia; after a few contacts the Portuguese needed to know how to get to Ethiopia, although they had little information about that empire. This knowledge was transmitted by travelers, geographers, pilgrims, merchants and politicians returning home after long trips.

== Official presence ==
Official Portuguese presence in Asia was established in 1500, when the Portuguese commander Pedro Álvares Cabral obtained from the King of Cochin Una Goda Varma Koil a number of houses to serve as a feitoria, or trading post in exchange for an alliance against the hostile Zamorin of Calicut. In 1503 Afonso de Albuquerque built Fort Manuel in Cochin with the authorization of its ruler. In 1505, King Manuel of Portugal appointed Dom Francisco de Almeida as viceroy of India, with jurisdiction over all Crown domains east of the Cape of Good Hope. Official Portuguese territory in Asia included:

- Portuguese India
- Portuguese Ceylon
- Portuguese Oman
- Portuguese Socotra
- Portuguese Malacca
- Portuguese Timor
- Portuguese Macau
- Fort São João Baptista in Ternate
- Fort Nossa Senhora da Conceição in Hormuz

== Timeline of ships, voyages and contacts ==
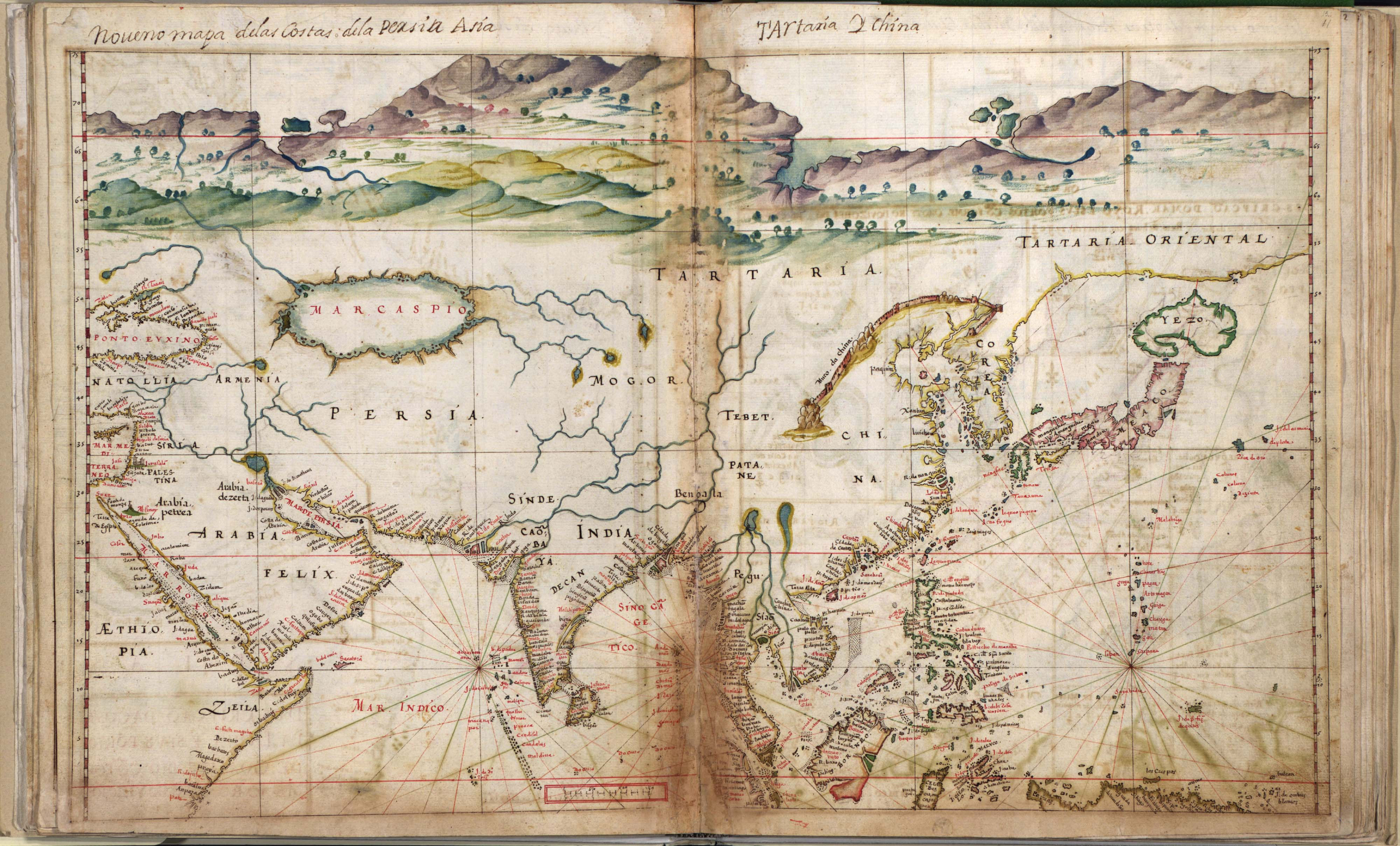
Portuguese map of Asia, 1630

=== India and Ceylon ===
- 1497-1499: Vasco da Gama, accompanied by Nicolau Coelho and Bartolomeu Dias, was the first European to reach India by sailing from the Atlantic to the Indian Ocean exclusively by a sea route.
- 1500-1501: After the discovery of Brazil, Pedro Álvares Cabral with half the original fleet of 13 ships and 1,500 men undertook the second Portuguese voyage to India. The ships were commanded by Cabral, Bartolomeu Dias, Nicolau Coelho, Sancho de Tovar, Simão de Miranda, Aires Gomes da Silva, Vasco de Ataíde, Diogo Dias, Simão de Pina, Luís Pires, Pêro de Ataíde and Nuno Leitão da Cunha. It is not known whether Gaspar de Lemos or André Gonçalves commanded the ship which returned to Portugal with news of the discovery. Luis Pires returned to Portugal via Cape Verde. The ships of de Ataíde, Dias, de Pina and Gomes were lost near the Cape of Good Hope. The ship commanded by Diogo Dias separated and discovered Madagascar, followed later by the Red Sea, which he was the first to reach by sea. Nuno Leitão da Cunha, Nicolau Coelho, Sancho de Tovar, Simão de Miranda, Pero de Ataíde completed the trip to India. Among others who undertook the voyages were Pêro Vaz de Caminha and the Franciscan Frei Henrique de Coimbra.
- 1501-?: João da Nova commanded the third Portuguese expedition to India. On the way he discovered Ascension Island (1501) and Island of St. Helena (1502) in the Atlantic.
- 1502-1503: Second trip of Vasco de Gama to India.
- 1503-1504: Afonso de Albuquerque established the first Portuguese fort at Cochin, India.
- 1505 Francisco de Almeida is appointed the first Viceroy of Portuguese India. He left Lisbon with a fleet of 22 vessels, including 14 carracks and 6 caravels carrying a crew of 1,000 and 1,500 soldiers. His son, Lourenço de Almeida, explored the south coast of Ceylon, present-day island of Sri Lanka.

=== Middle East ===
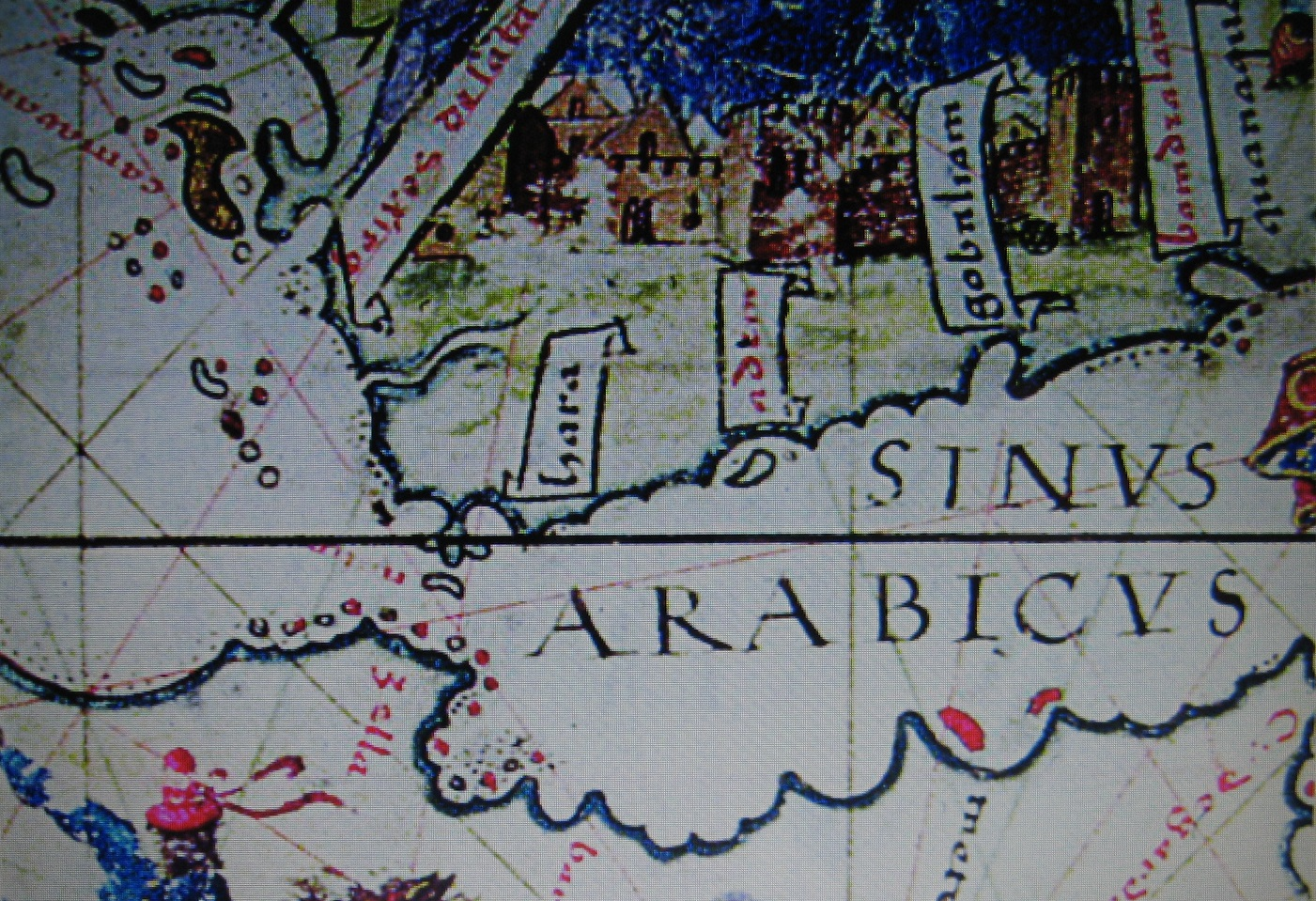
Lopo Homem's map depicting the Gulf of Aden, with Ilha do Camarão being noticeable, just above the island of Perim

- 1485: Duarte Barbosa (d. 1521) was reputedly the first Portuguese to visit Bahrain, then a part of the Jabrid state with its center in al-Hasa. His work "The Book of Duarte Barbosa" (Livro de Duarte Barbosa) published in 1518 reports on the coastal areas of the Indian Ocean.
- 1507-1510: de Albuquerque captures the kingdom of Hormuz (Ormus) in the Persian Gulf. It is so named after the Viceroy of India in 1508. In 1510 Goa was captured, which quickly became the most successful Portuguese settlement in India.

=== Southeast Asia ===
- 1511: de Albuquerque conquers Malacca, after Diogo Lopes de Sequeira's visit there in 1509. Malacca becomes a strategic base for Portuguese expansion in Southeast Asia.
- Also during the conquest, given their influence on the Malacca Peninsula, he sent Duarte Fernandes to the court of Ramathibodi II of the Kingdom of Siam.
- In November of that year, after securing Malacca and getting to know the location of what was called "the Spice Islands", or the Banda Islands in the Moluccas, he sent an expedition of three ships commanded by his trusted friend António de Abreu, with Francisco Serrão and Afonso Bisagudo to find them.
- 1512: Malay pilots guided Abreu and the Portuguese via Java, the Lesser Sunda Islands and the island of Ambão to Banda, where they arrived in early 1512. They remained there, as the first Europeans to reach the islands, for about a month, purchasing and filling their holds with nutmeg and cloves. Abreu then went sailing by Ambao while his deputy commander Francisco Serrão went on to the Moluccas but was shipwrecked, to end in Ternate. Busy with hostilities in other parts of the archipelago, such as Ambão and Ternate, he returned only in 1529. Serrao establishes a fort on the island of Ternate, in what today is Indonesia.
- 1518: King Manuel I of Portugal sent an ambassador to the Kingdom of Siam and offered a proposal to formalize a treaty for a commercial, political and military alliance, which included the possibility of Siamese commerce in Malacca.
- 1522: The treaty of Sunda Kalapa was signed on 21 August between the Kingdom of Sunda and Portugal, with a view to forging a military alliance and building a fort, which could not be worked out, and which was marked by a pattern of stone, known as the Standard Luso Sundanese (Padrão Luso Sundanês).
- 1522: After the circumnavigation by Ferdinand Magellan in 1519, Spain sought a review of the demarcation of the globe undertaken by the Treaty of Tordesillas. This limit would be imposed on the Moluccan islands, used as reference. Portugal and Spain both sent several scouting expeditions to defend their respective interests.
- 1525: Gomes de Sequeira and Diogo da Rocha were sent by Governor Jorge de Meneses, to discover territories north of the Moluccas, and were the first Europeans to reach the Caroline Islands, northeast of New Guinea, which were then named the "Sequeira Islands".
- 1586: António da Madalena, a Portuguese Capuchin friar, was among the first Western visitors to come to Angkor (current-day Cambodia). There he participated in a city reconstruction effort, but the project was unsuccessful.

=== China and Japan ===
- 1513: Jorge Álvares was the first European to contribute to reach China, at Nei Lingding Island in the Pearl River estuary.
- 1517: The Portuguese merchant Fernão Pires de Andrade established the first modern commercial contact with the Chinese in the estuary of the Pearl River and then in Canton (Guangzhou).
- 1524: Third voyage of Vasco da Gama to India.
- 1542: After a trip through Sumatra, Malaysia, the Kingdom of Siam, China, Korea and possibly in Cochinchina (Vietnam), Fernão Mendes Pinto claims to have been one of the first Europeans to reach Japan (This, however, is highly unlikely).
- 1543: António Mota blown off course by a storm to the island of Nison, called Jepwen (Japan) by the Chinese.
- 1549: A Japanese fugitive known as Anjirō is presented to the Jesuit Francis Xavier by merchants, Pinto possibly among them.
- 1557 Official establishment of the Macau commercial warehouse, near the mouth of the Pearl River, just south of Canton.
- 1602: In September, Bento de Góis left Goa with a small group in search of the legendary Grand Cathay, a kingdom said to be home to Nestorian Christian communities. The journey covered more than 6000 kilometers (in three years). In early 1606 Bento de Góis reached Sochaw (Suzhou, now known as Jiuquan, near the Great Wall of China, a city near Dunhuang in Gansu province) and proved that the kingdom of Cathay and the kingdom of China were ultimately the same as the city of Khambalaik, of Marco Polo. It was indeed the city of Beijing.
- 1610: Father Manuel Dias Jr. (Yang Ma-No), a Jesuit missionary, reached China and then Beijing in 1613. Just three years after Galileo released the first telescope, Manuel Dias reported its principles and operation for the first time in China. In 1615 he was author of Tian Wen Lüe (Explicatio Sphaerae Coelestis), which featured the most advanced European astronomical knowledge of the time in the form of questions and answers, to questions asked by the Chinese.
- 1672: Thomas Pereira arrived in Macau. He lived in China until his death in 1708. He was introduced to the Kangxi Emperor by his Jesuit colleague Ferdinand Verbiest. Astronomer, geographer and mainly a musician, he was the author of a treatise on European music translated into Chinese, and responsible for the creation of Chinese names for musical technical terms from the West, many of which are still used today.

== Legacy ==
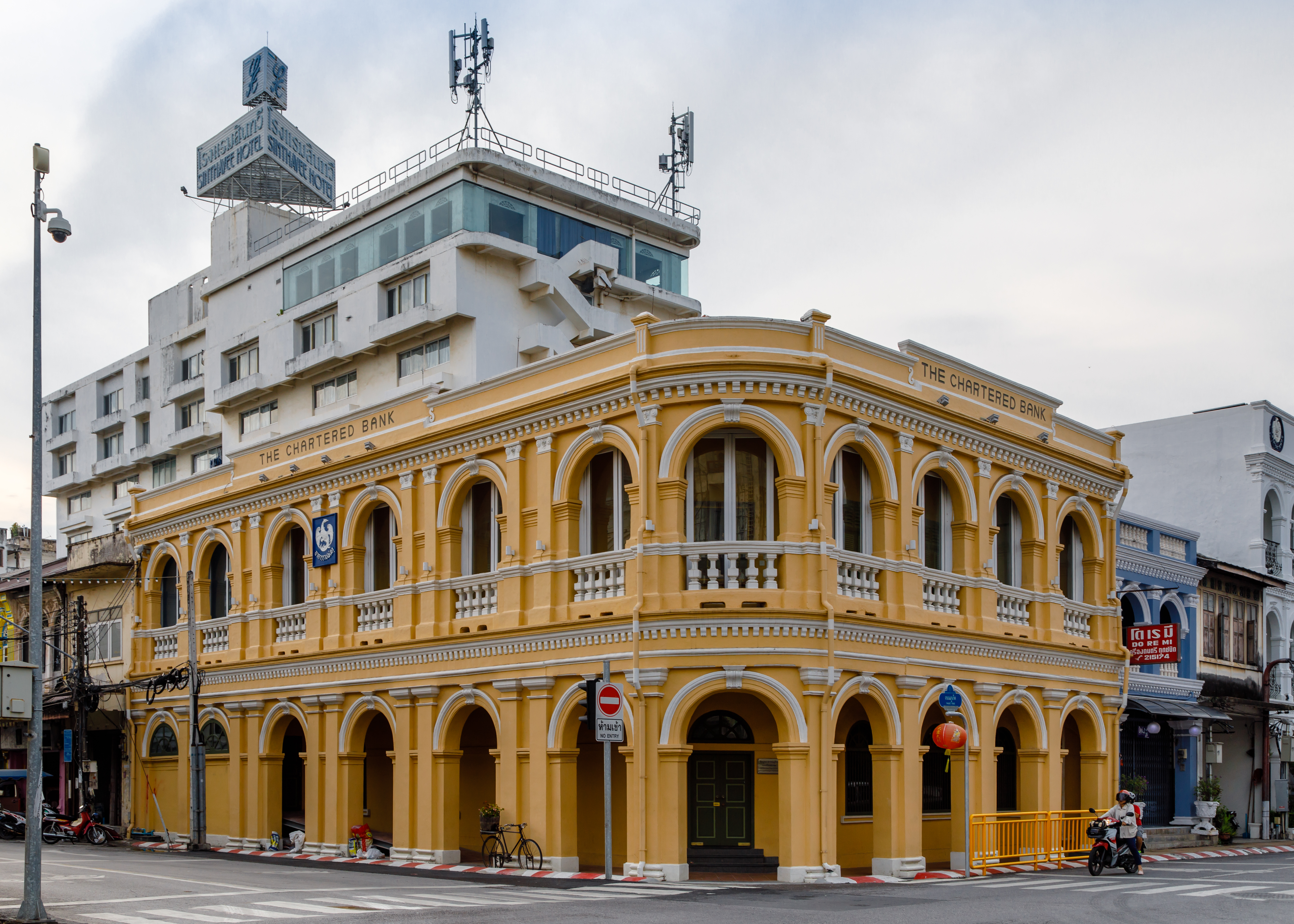
Sino-Portuguese architecture dots the urban landscape of Phuket, Thailand and some parts of Southeast Asia.

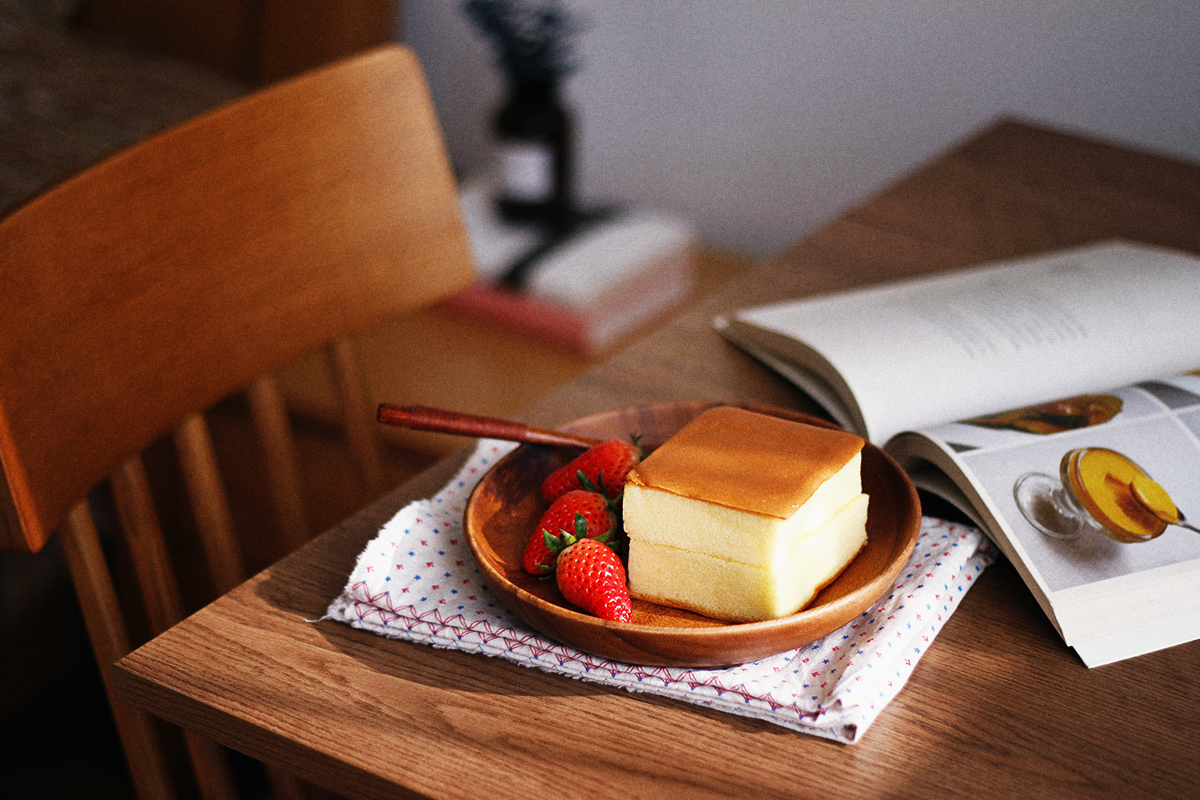
Pão de Castela (Kasutera), a specialty of Nagasaki, Japan

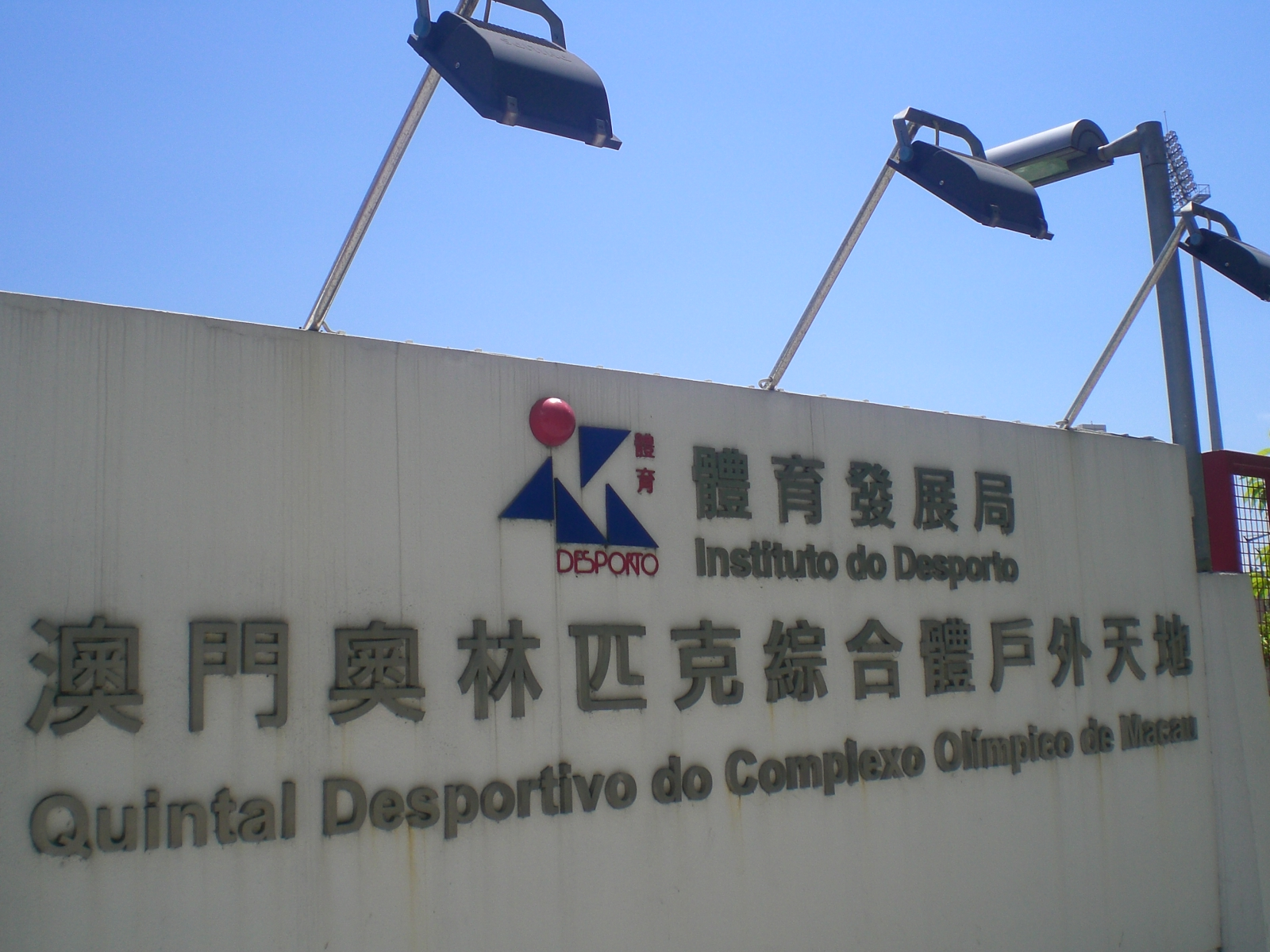
Estádio Campo Desportivo, the largest sporting complex in Macau

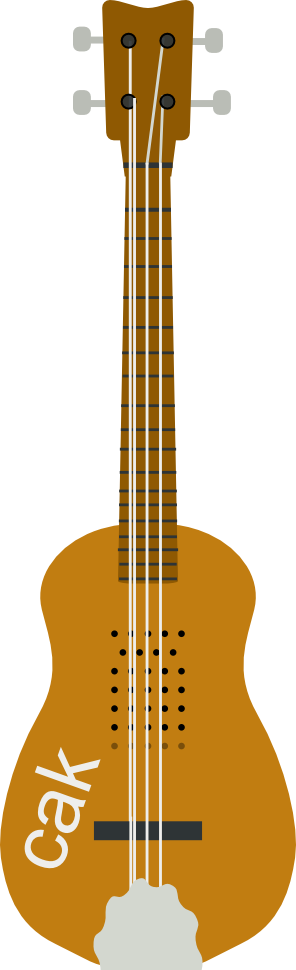
Kroncong, Indonesian instrument inspired in the Portuguese music guitar, Cavaquinho

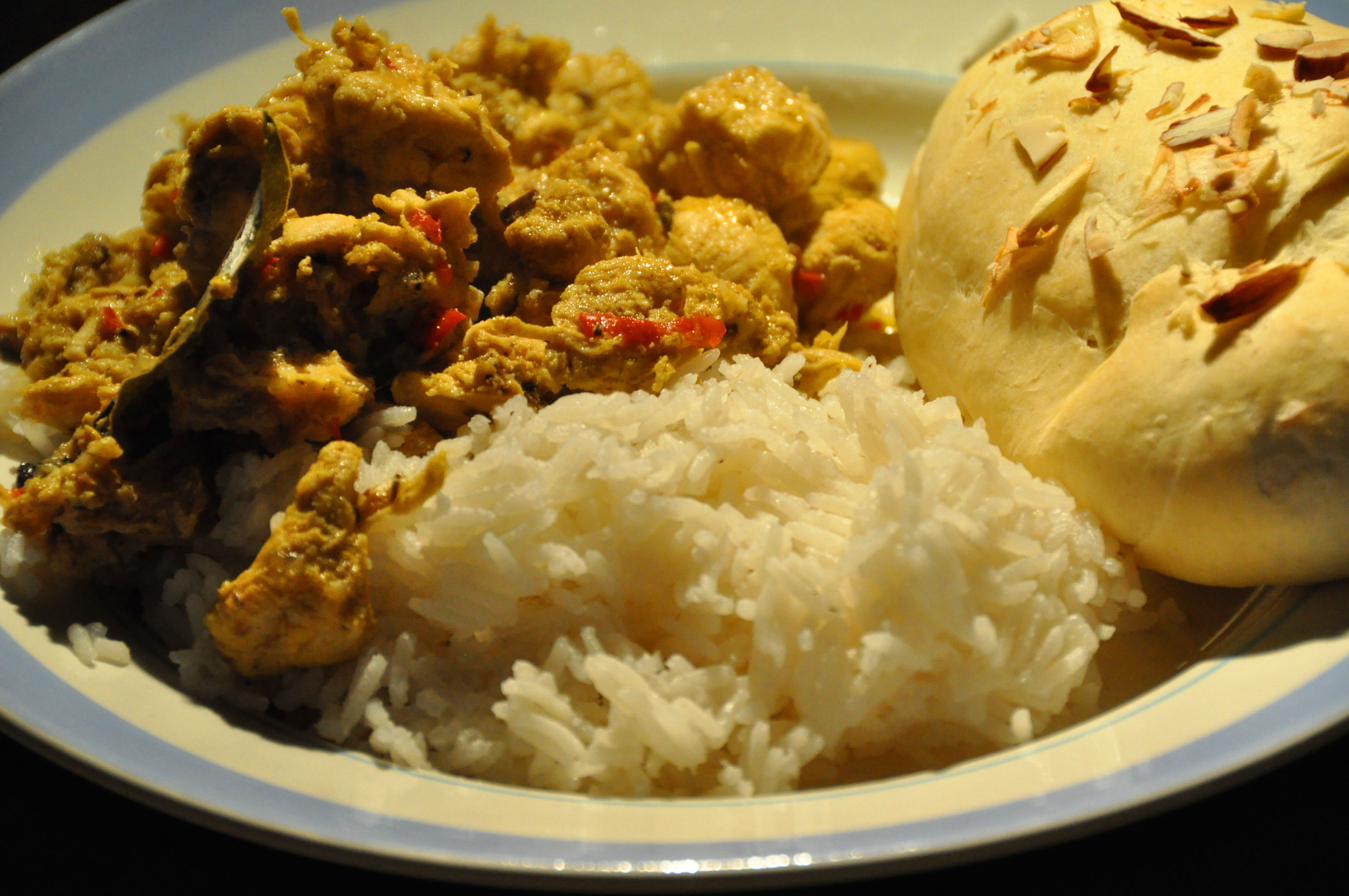
Vindalho, typical Goan dish

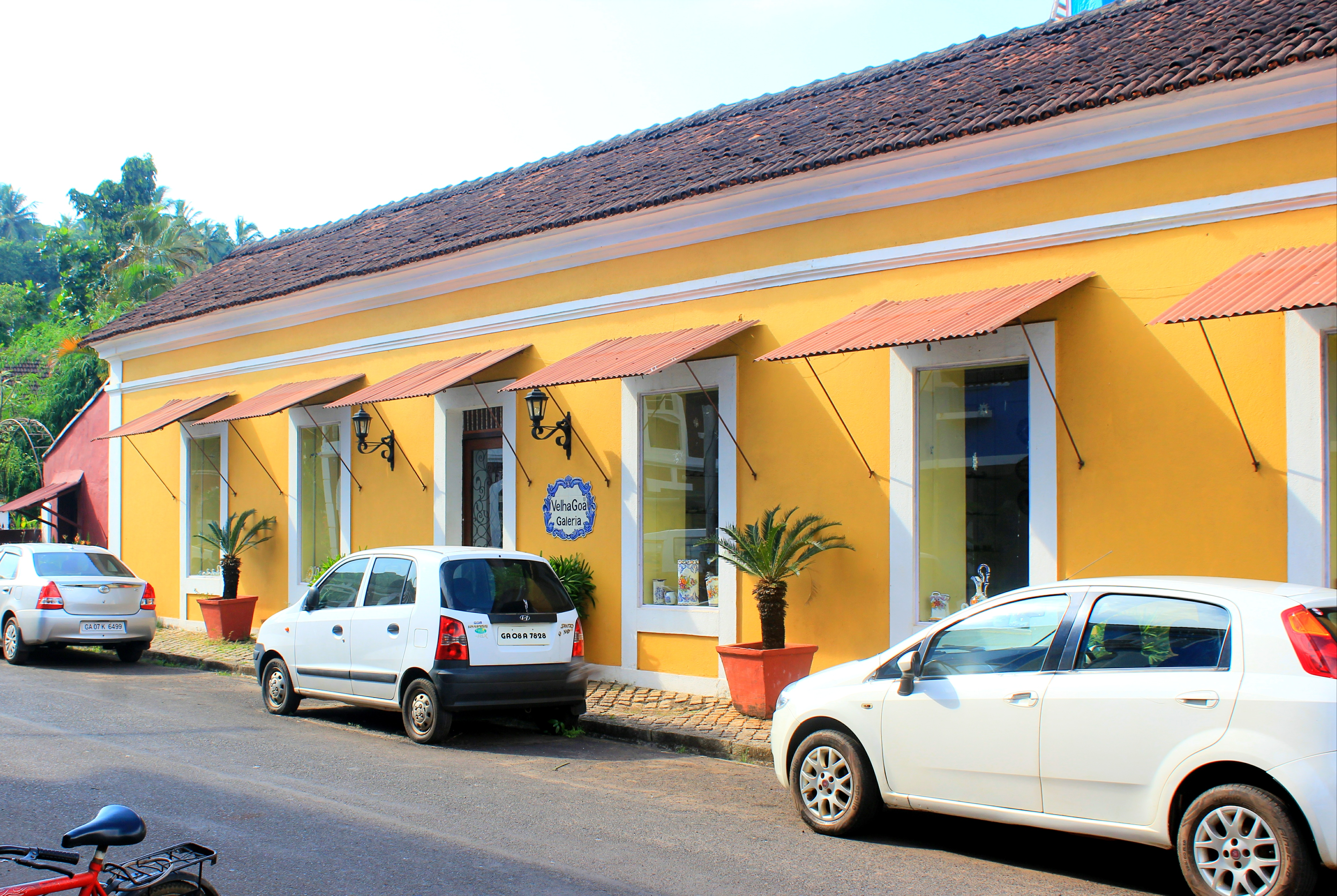
Velha Goa Galeria, Panaji

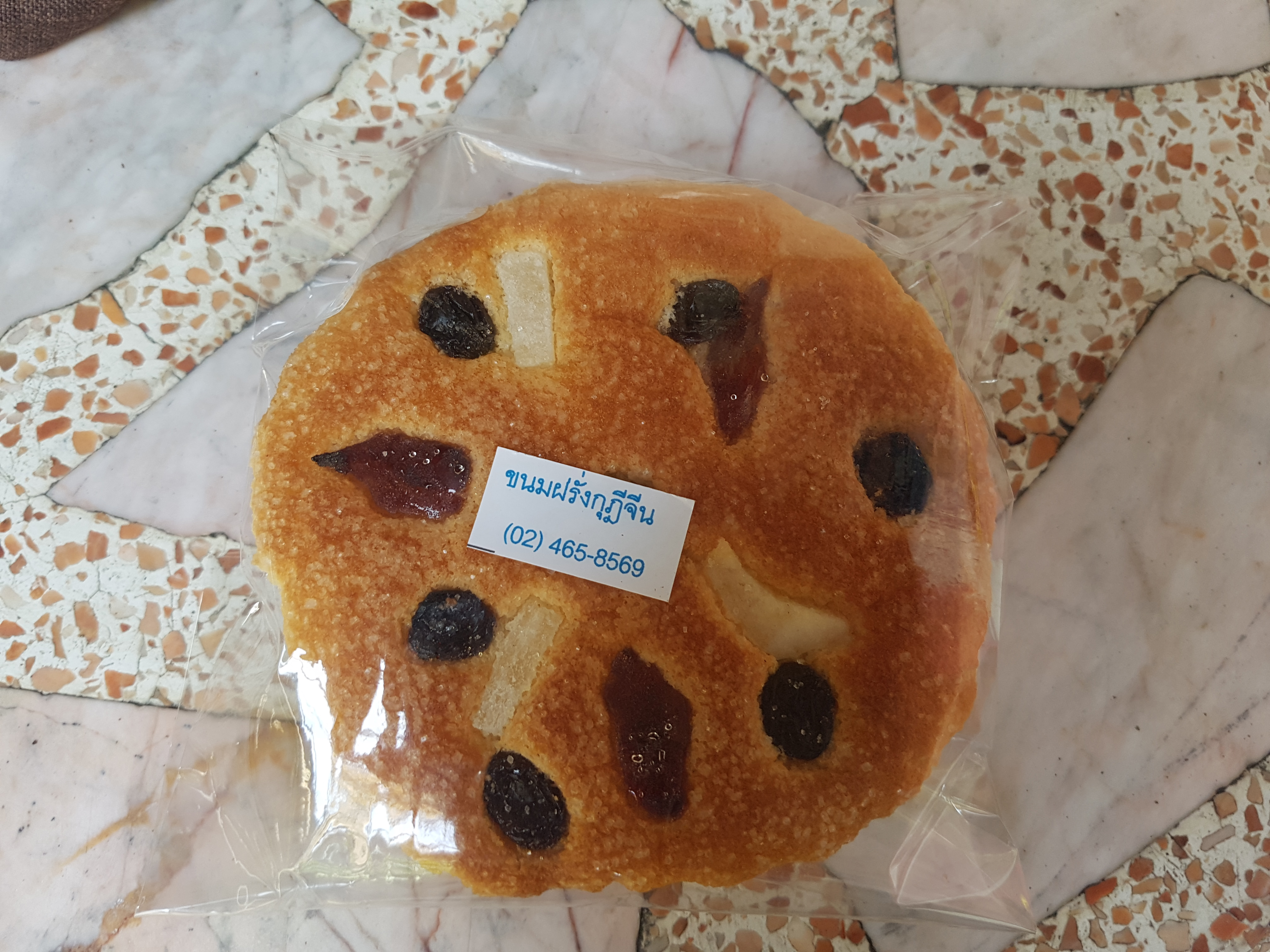
Portuguese-influenced Thai delicacy, Khanom Kudichin

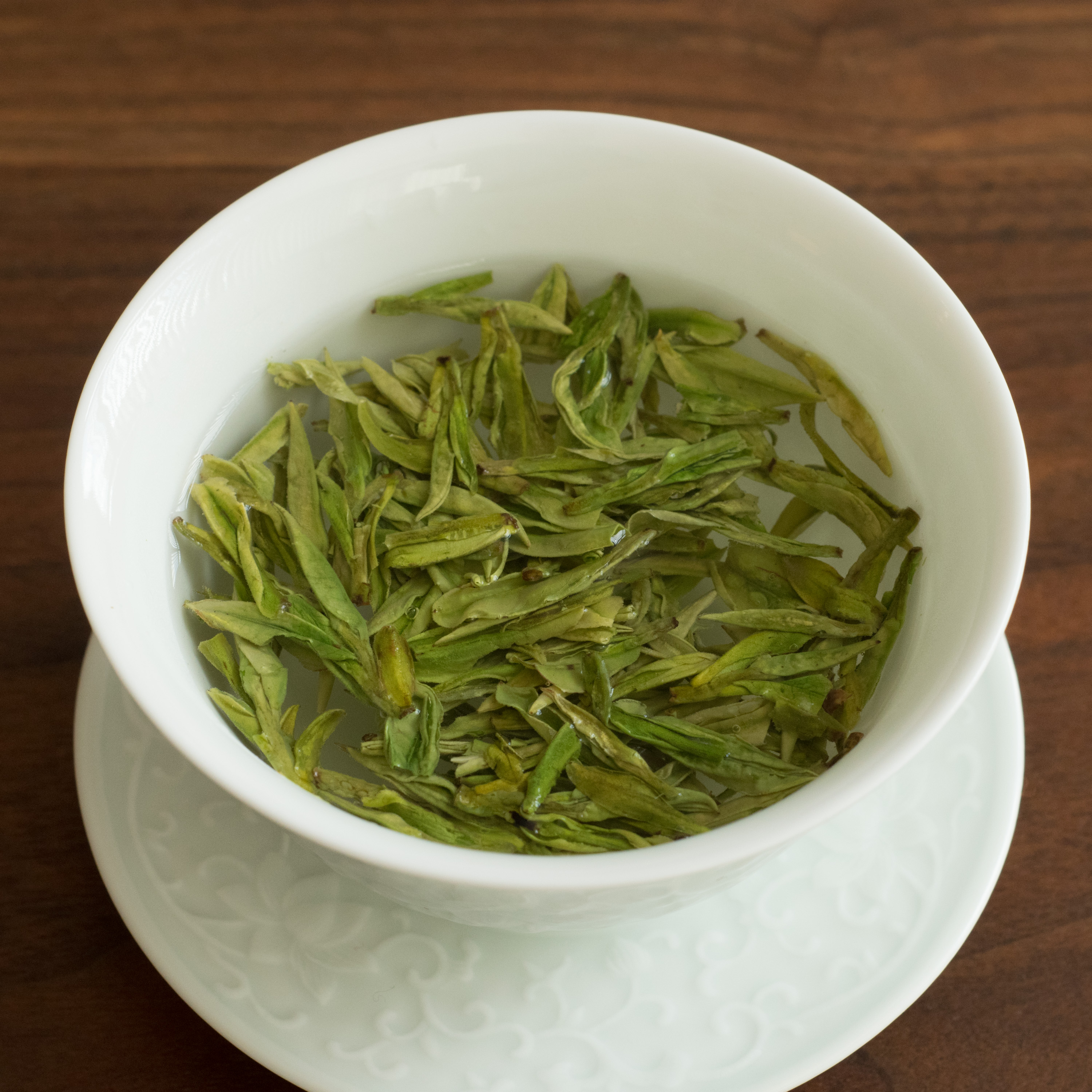
Portuguese priests and merchants introduced Tea to Europe during the 16th century.

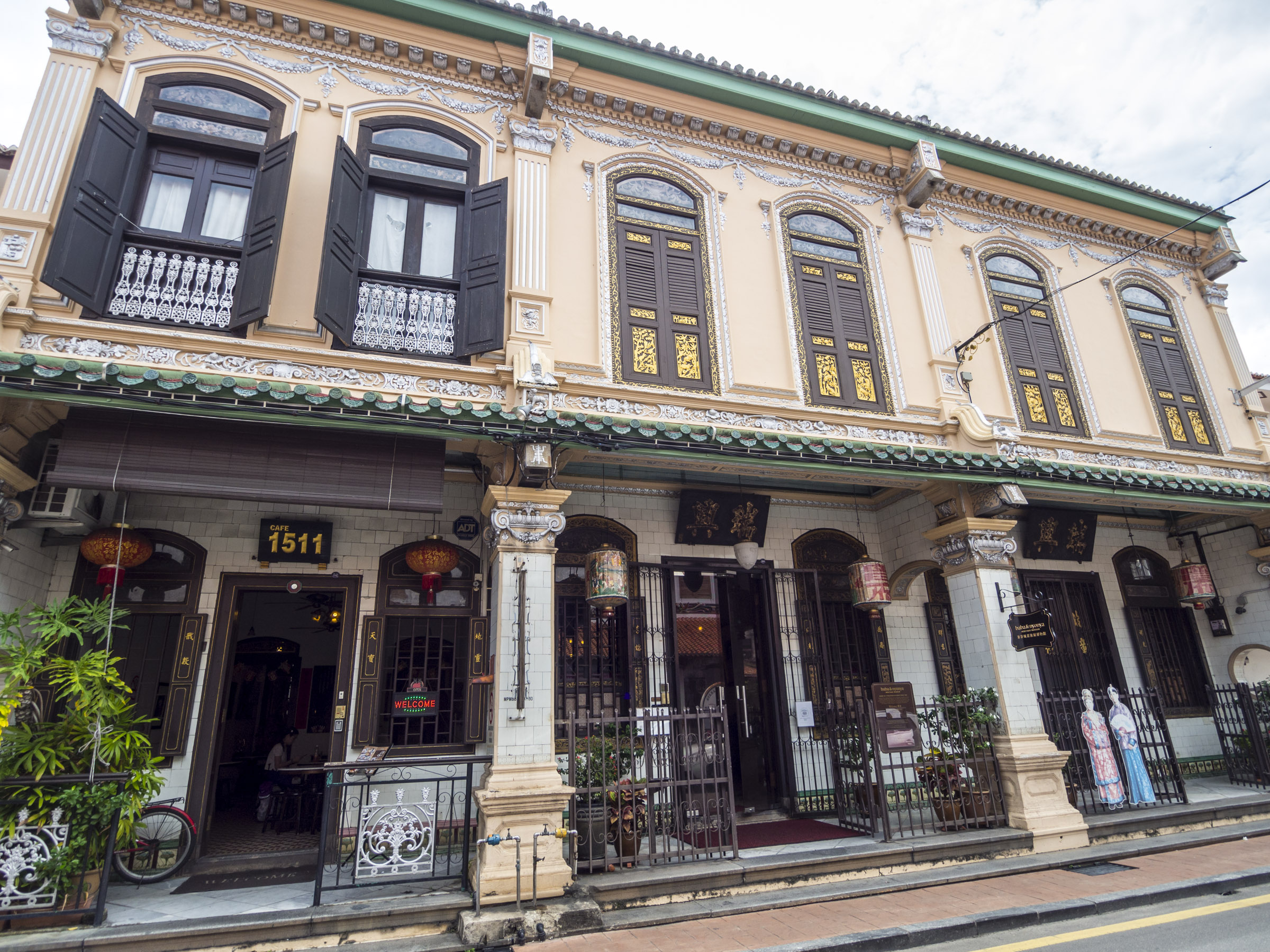
Sino-Portuguese architecture seen in Baba Nyonya Heritage Museum, Malacca City, Malaysia

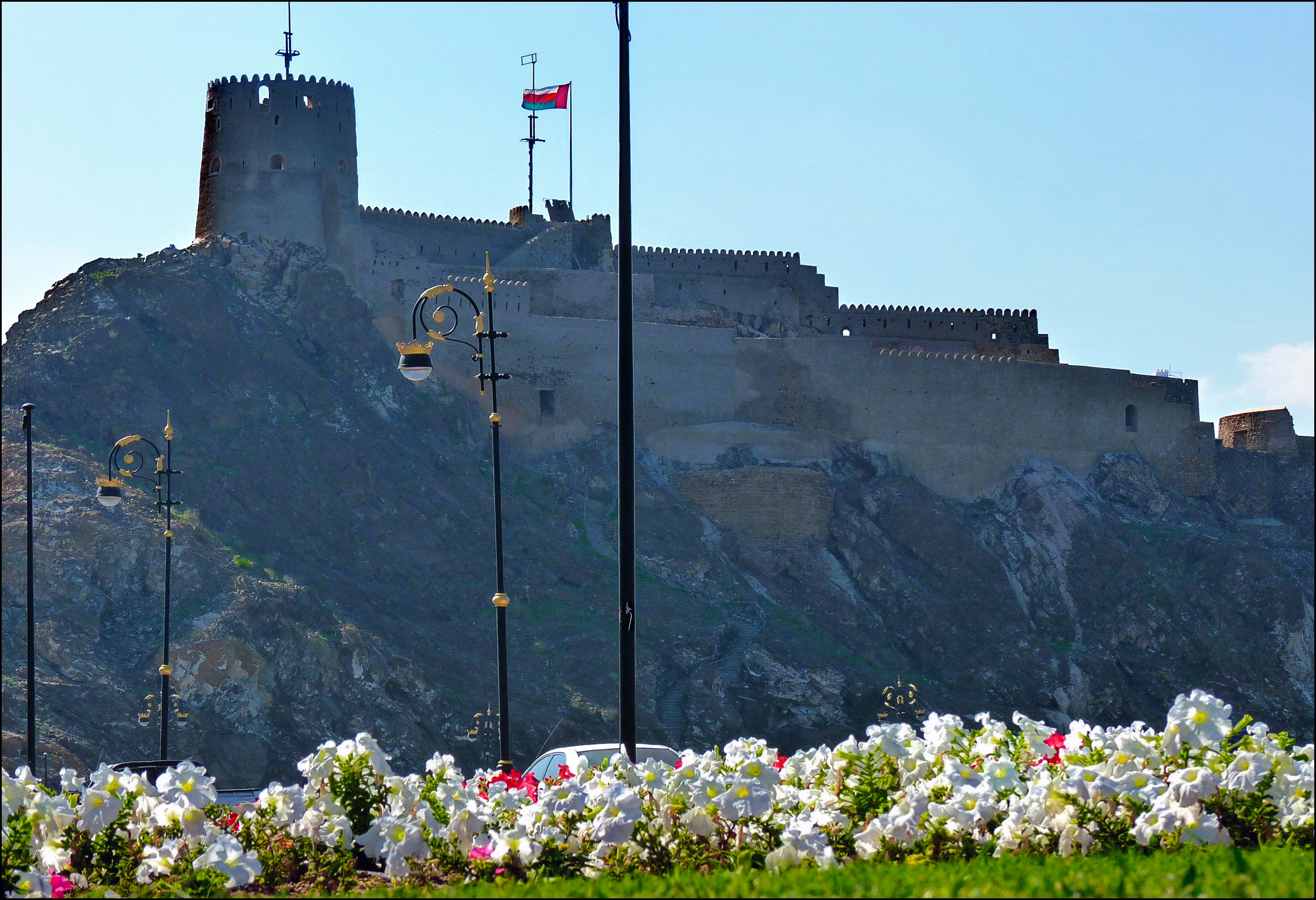
Al Jalali Fort, Muscat, Oman

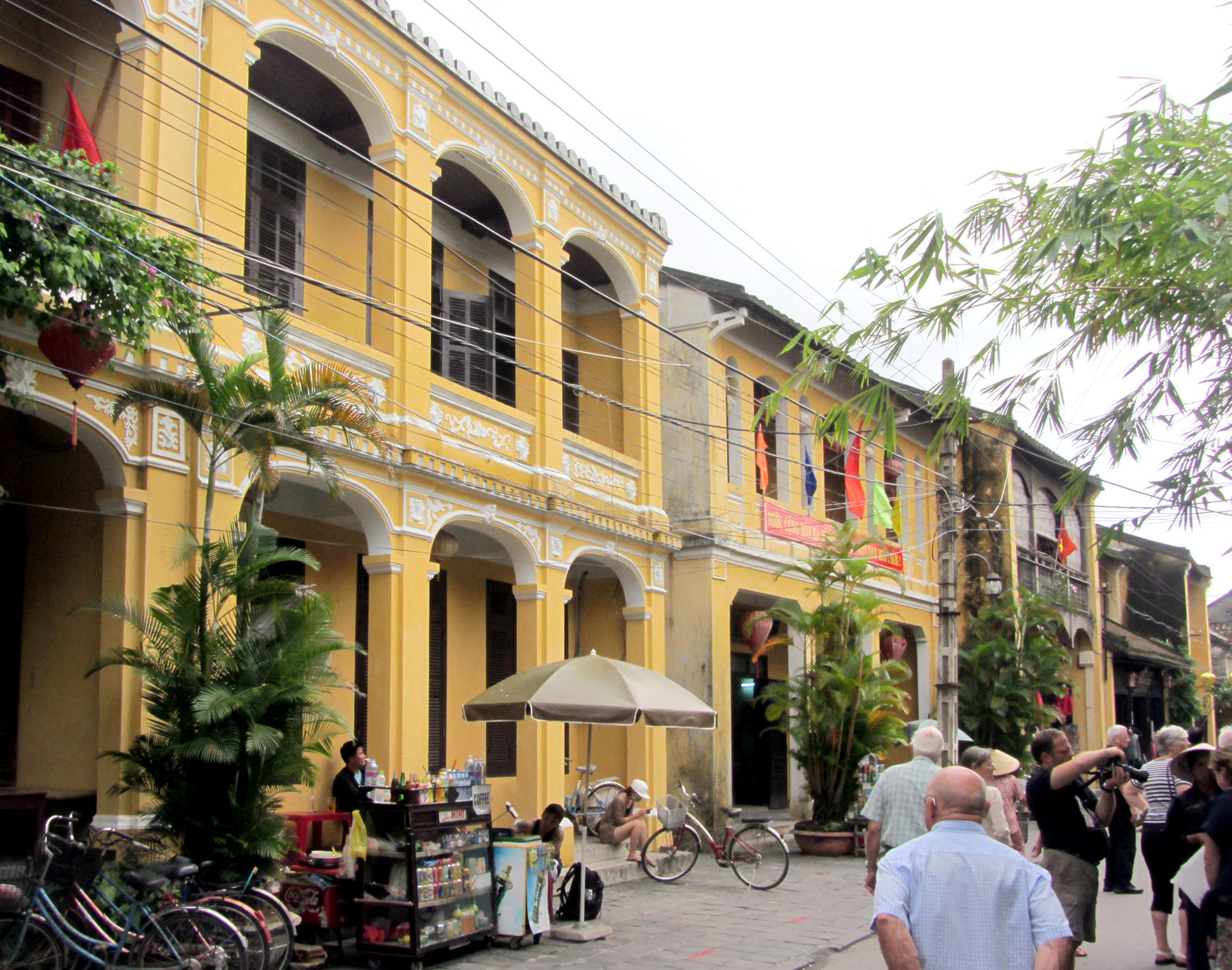
Houses in Hội An, Vietnam

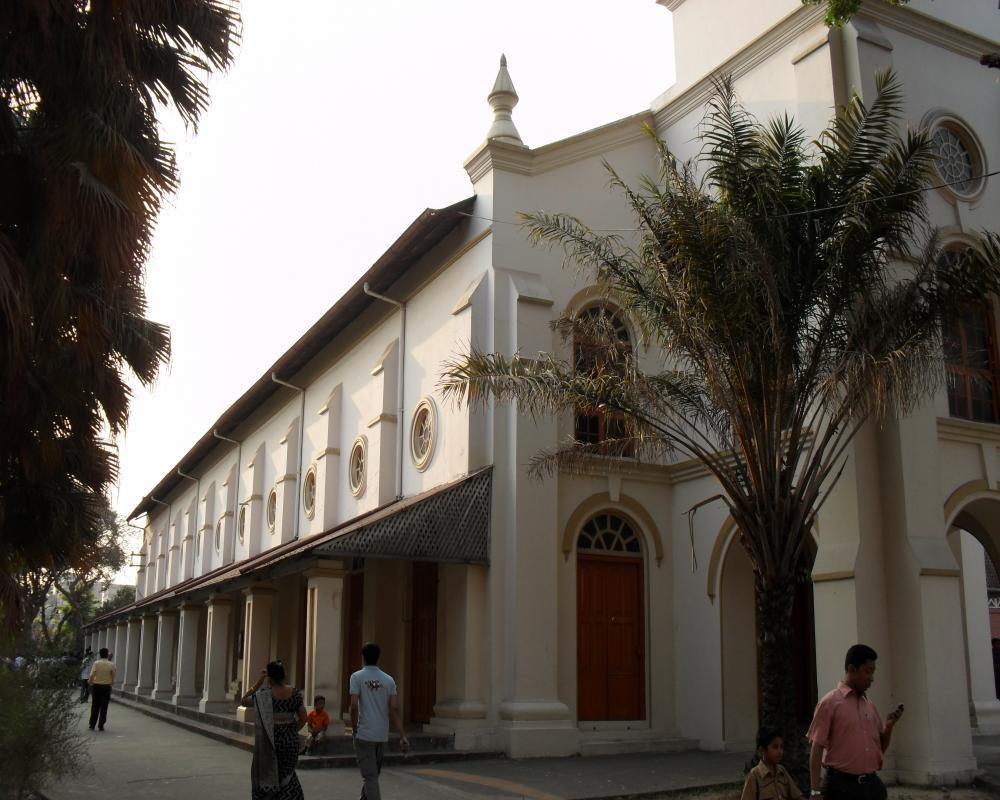
Chittagong Cathedral, the centre of Catholic Bangladeshis community in the city of Chittagong

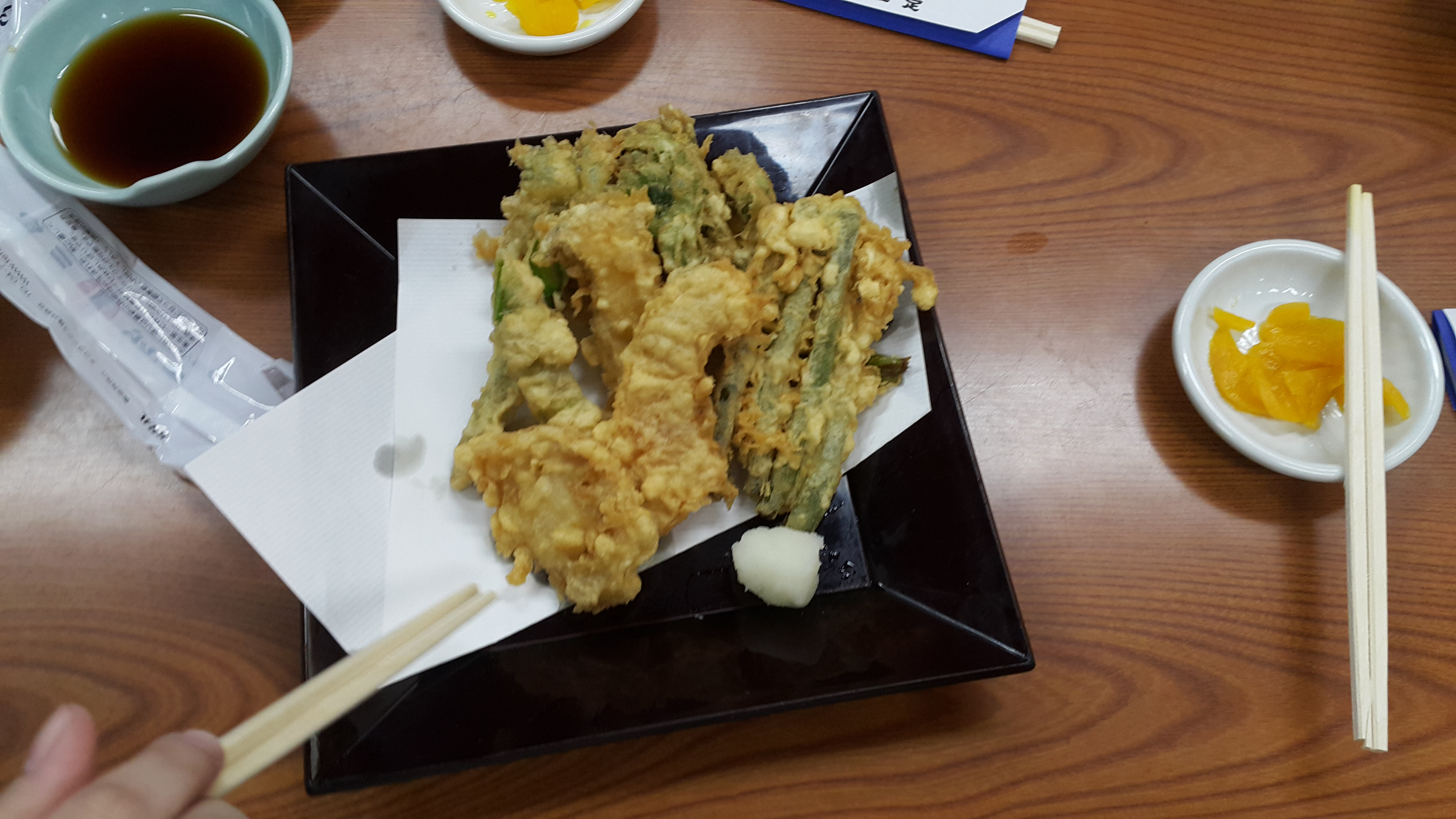
Japanese dish Tempura, as served in Tokyo

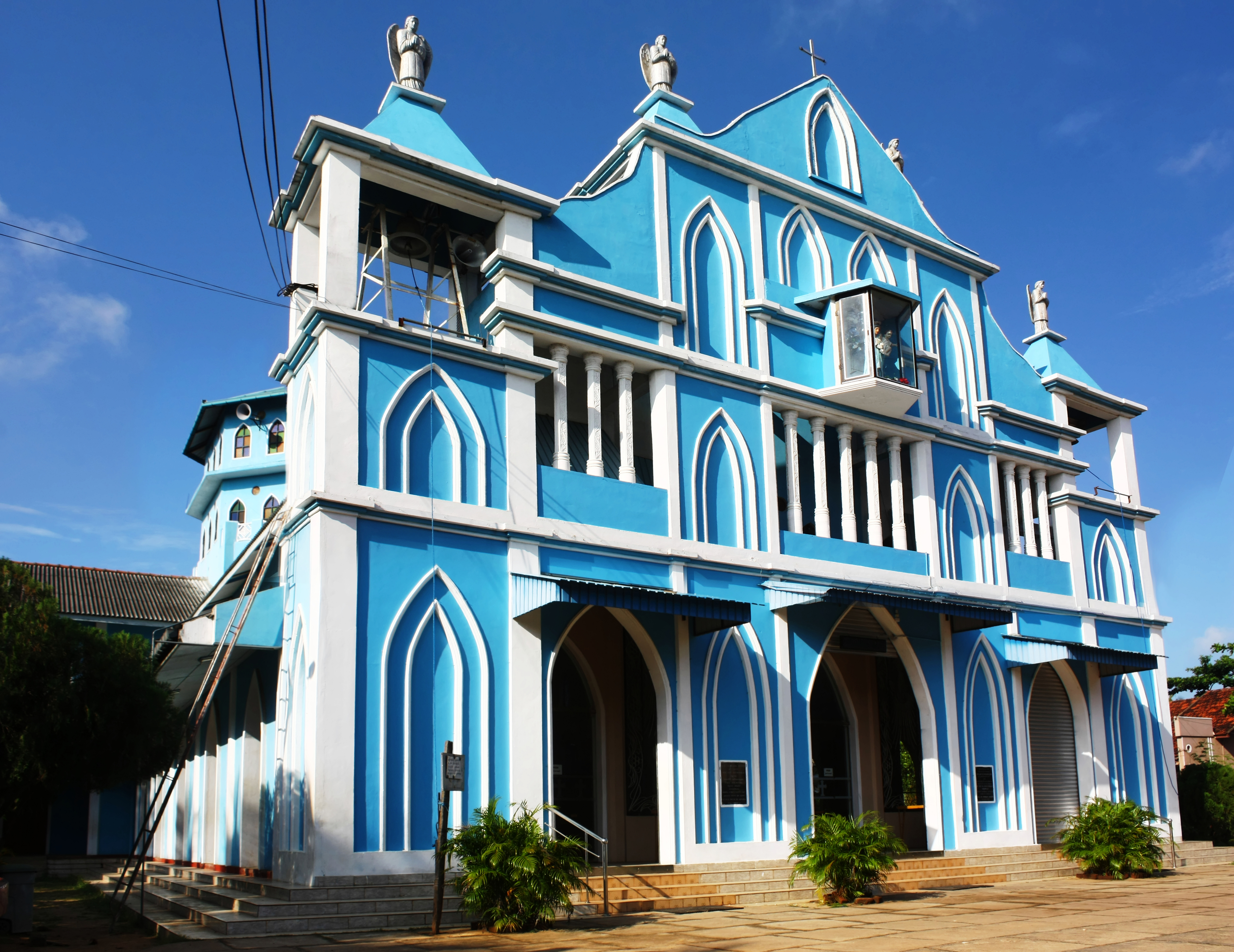
Batticaloa Cathedral, the Church of Our Lady of Presentation, Sri Lanka
- Churches and convents of Goa
- Santa Cruz Church
- Historic Centre of Macau
- St. Peter's Church
- Diu Fort
- Diocese of Larantuka
- Fort of Our Lady of the Conception
- Portuguese Church, Kolkata
- Motael Church

== Literature ==
- Suma Oriental, Tomé Pires, 1515

The Suma Oriental, the first European description of Malaysia, is the oldest and most extensive description of the Portuguese East. Tomé Pires was a prominent Portuguese apothecary who lived in the East in the sixteenth century and was the first Portuguese ambassador to China. The Suma Oriental describes the plants and medicinal drugs of the East and beyond medicine also thoroughly describes trading ports, of potential interest to the Portuguese newcomers in the Indian Ocean, electing as its main objective the commercial information, including all products traded in each kingdom and each port, as well as their origins and the merchants that undertook the traffic. This study precedes Garcia da Orta, and was discovered in the 1940s by the historian Armando Cortesão.

- Livro de Duarte Barbosa, Duarte Barbosa, 1518

Duarte Barbosa was an official of Portuguese India between 1500 and 1516-17 holding the post of scrivener in Kannur and at times local language interpreter (for Malayalam). His "Book of Duarte Barbosa" describing the places he visited is one of the oldest examples of Portuguese travel literature soon after their arrival in the Indian Ocean. In 1519 Duarte Barbosa went on the first circumnavigation with Magellan, his brother-in-law. He died in May 1521 at the poisoned banquet of King Humabon in the island of Cebu in the Philippines.

- Chronica dos reis de Bisnaga, Domingo Pais and Fernão Nunes, 1520 and 1535

Domingos Pais and Fernão Nunes made important reports on the Vijayanagara Empire, or "Reino de Bisnaga" (as it was referred to by the Portuguese) located in Deccan in southern India during the reign of Bukka Raya II and Deva Raya I. Its description of Hampi, the Hindu imperial capital, is the most detailed of all historical narratives on this ancient city.

- História do descobrimento e conquista da Índia pelos portugueses, Fernão Lopes de Castanheda, 1551

It was Coimbra that printed eight of the ten books that Fernão Lopes de Castanheda had scheduled about the history of the discovery and conquest of India by the Portuguese. He wished his work to be the first to celebrate historiographically the Portuguese effort. The first volume came out in 1551. Volumes II and III appeared in 1552, the fourth and fifth in 1553, the sixth in 1554 and the eighth in 1561. The seventh was published without place or date. After the publication of the eighth volume, Queen Catherine, yielding to pressure from some nobles who did not like the objectivity of Castanheda, banned the printing of the remaining volumes, IX and X. His work, still valid for its vast geographic and ethnographic information, was widely translated and read in the Europe of the time.

- Décadas da Ásia, João de Barros, 1552

Written by João de Barros following a proposal of Dom Manuel I from a story narrating the achievements of the Portuguese in India and thus titled because, like the work of the Roman historian Livy, he also grouped the events in periods of ten years. The first decade came out in 1552, the second in 1553 and third was printed in 1563. The fourth decade, unfinished, was completed by engineer, mathematician and Portuguese cosmographer João Baptista Lavanha (Lisbon, c 1550 -. Madrid, March 31, 1624) and published in Madrid in 1615, long after his death. The Decades met little interest in their author's lifetime. It is known that only an Italian translation came out, in Venice in 1563. John III of Portugal (Dom João III), enthusiastic about its contents, asked the author to draw up a chronicle on the events of the reign of Dom Manuel, which Barros could not do, and the chronicle in question was drafted by Damião de Gois. As a historian and linguist, de Barros made "Decades" a precious source of information about the history of the Portuguese in Asia and the beginnings of modern historiography in Portugal and worldwide.

- Colóquios dos simples e drogas da India, Garcia da Orta, 1563

Written in Portuguese in the form of a dialogue between Garcia da Orta and Ruano, a newcomer colleague in Goa looking forward to encountering the materia medica of India. A literal translation of its title would be "Colloquium of simple drugs and medicinal things in India". The Colloquium includes 57 chapters covering an approximately equal number of oriental drugs such as aloe, benzoin, camphor, the canafistula, opium, rhubarb, tamarinds and many others. It presents the first rigorous description by a European of the botanical characteristics, origin and therapeutic properties of many medicinal plants, which though previously known in Europe, were wrongly or very incompletely described and only in the form of the drug, i.e. the part of the plant collected and dried.

- Tratado das cousas da China, Gaspar da Cruz, 1569

The "Treatise of things from China," published in 1569 by Friar Gaspar da Cruz was the first complete work on China and the Ming Dynasty in the West since Marco Polo published in Europe. It includes information about geography, provinces, royalty, employees, bureaucracy, transport, architecture, agriculture, handicrafts, trade matters, clothing, religious and social customs, music and instruments, writing, education and justice, thus containing a text which had a role in influencing the image Europeans had of China.

- Os Lusíadas, Luís Vaz de Camões, 1572

The Lusíadas of Luís Vaz de Camões (c 1524-1580) is considered the Portuguese epic par excellence. Probably completed in 1556, it was first published in 1572, three years after the return of the author from the East. En route from Goa to Portugal, Camões in 1568 made a stopover on the island of Mozambique, where Diogo do Couto found, as was related in his work, "so poor living friends" (Decade 8th Asia). Diogo do Couto paid for the rest of his trip to Lisbon, where Camões arrived in 1570.

- Nippo Jisho (日葡辞書), Vocabvlário da Lingoa de Iapam, João Rodrigues, 1603

Nippo Jisho, or Vocabvlário of Lingoa of IAPAM was the first Japanese-Portuguese dictionary created and the first to translate Japanese into any Western language. It was published in Nagasaki (Japan) in 1603. It explains 32,000 Japanese words, translated into Portuguese. The Society of Jesus (Jesuits), with the collaboration of the Japanese, compiled this dictionary over several years. This was meant to be of help to missionaries in studying the language. It was thought that the Portuguese priest João Rodrigues was the main organizer of the project.

- Peregrinação, Fernão Mendes Pinto, 1614

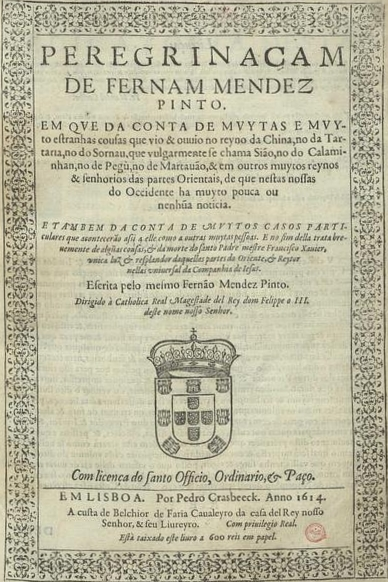
Cover page of "Peregrinação" by Fernão Mendes Pinto

The "Pilgrimage" of Fernando Mendes Pinto is perhaps the most translated book of travel literature. It was published in 1614, thirty years after the author's death. What is striking is its exotic content. The author is an expert in describing the geography of India, China and Japan, laws, customs, morals, festivals, trade, justice, war, funerals, etc. Noteworthy also is the forecast of the collapse of the Portuguese Empire.

- Tian Wen Lüe or Explicatio Sphaerae Coelestis, Manuel Dias, 1615

Manuel Dias (Yang Ma-On) (1574-1659) was a Portuguese Jesuit missionary undertook some notable activities in China, particularly in astronomy. This work presents the most advanced European astronomical knowledge of the time in the form of questions and answers to questions posed by the Chinese.

== See also ==
- Portuguese discoveries
- Luso-Asians
- Portuguese language in Asia
- Portuguese colonialism in Indonesia
- Portuguese Bombay and Bassein
- Bassein Fort
- Nanban trade
- Macanese people
- Eurasians in Singapore
- Patuá macaense
- Ilha de São João
- Portuguese Indonesian
- Papiá kristáng
- Luso-Sundanese Padrão
- Daman and Diu Portuguese creole
- Instituto Português do Oriente
- Diu Indo-Portuguese creole
- Korlai Indo-Portuguese
- Yokoseura
- Sri Lankan Portuguese creole
- Goan Catholics
- Portuguese Empire

== Bibliography ==
- Guia da Exposição Os portugueses e o Oriente, Biblioteca Nacional de Portugal. Exhibition Guide: The Portuguese and the East, National Library of Portugal (in Portuguese)
- Ricklefs, M.C. (1993). A History of Modern Indonesia Since c.1300, 2nd Edition. London: MacMillan. p. 25. ISBN 0-333-57689-6
- Milton, Giles (1999). Nathaniel's Nutmeg. London: Sceptre. pp. 5 and 7. ISBN 978-0-340-69676-7
- Vera Lucia Bottrel Tostes, Bravos homens de outrora, Camoes - Revista de Latras e Culturas Lusofonas, no. 8, January - March 2000
