= António da Madalena =

Portuguese Roman Catholic friar

António da Madalena (sometimes spelled, in English, Antonio da Magdalena, died c. 1589) was a Portuguese Capuchin friar who was the first Western visitor to Angkor in 1586.

== Biography ==
António da Madalena was born in Coimbra and lived in the Alcobaça Monastery from 1575 to 1579.

He travelled to Goa in 1580, to establish a library for his order. In 1583 he travelled overland to what is today Cambodia, where in 1586 he was the first Western visitor to Angkor.

He gave an account of his journey to Angkor to historian Diogo do Couto, the main chronicler and "guarda-mor" (curator) of the Archives of Portuguese exploration-colonization in Asia. Curiously, Diogo do Couto did not include Madalena's testimony in the sixth volume of the sum initiated by writer João de Barros, the Décadas da Ásia. He attempted to aid in a reconstruction effort of Angkor, but the project was unsuccessful.

In 1589, the Franciscan friar perished during shipwreck of the Sao Tomé caravel off Natal (South Africa), probably while he was heading back home after many years spent in India, Malacca and Ayuthaya in Siam.

== Posterity: the first Western visitor to Angkor ==
After do Couto's death, his personal papers were kept by his brother-in-law and priest Deodato da Trindade, and his wife's brother, Luisa de Melo.

In the fifth volume of the Décadas da Ásia (Asian Decades), written during the years 1586-1587 and published only in 1612, Diogo do Couto alludes to Father da Madalena as one of his informers on mainland Southeast Asian affairs. Though the description of Angkor was not included in the Décadas, it circulated quite widely since echoes of its content appeared in sundry Iberan published works of the first decades of the 17th century, such as Father Gabriel Quiroga de San Antonio's Breve y verdadera relacion de los sucessos del reyno de Camboxa in 1604; in Father Joao dos Santos' Ethiopia Oriental et varia historia de cousas notaveis de Oriente in 1609 and Bartolomé Leonardo de Argensola's Conquista de las Islas Malucas in 1609.

It was only in 1947 that historian Charles R. Boxer found do Couto's transcription of Madalena's original relation to his journey in Cambodia and made it known to a broader public, before it was translated in French by Bernard-Philippe Groslier in 1957:

This revealed a precise description of Angkor Wat and especially Angkor Thom as seen in 1550, which was discovered anew during a royal hunt by King Ang Chan, one hundred years after the fall of Angkor. While the Franciscan friar praised the beauty of the religious complex "like no other monument in the whole world", the friar also compares the stupas to Portuguese coruchea or capirote, usually worn by the Penitents seeking redemption in the Christian faith. Madalena correctly attributes an Indian origin to the Khmer architecture while Jesuit Pedro de Ribadeneira and his Spanish sources still believed it could have been the work of Alexander the Great and even in 1604, Dominican friar Gabriel Quiroga de San Antonio believed it could be a temple of the lost tribes of Israel.

== Bibliography ==
- Manuel Teixeira, "The Portuguese Missions in Malacca and Singapore (1511-1958): Malacca", Agência Geral do Ultramar, 1961
- Charles Higham, "The Civilization of Angkor", p. 1, University of California Press, 2004, ISBN 0-520-24218-1
- Bernard Philippe Groslier, "Angkor and Cambodia in the sixteenth century: according to Portuguese and Spanish sources", p. 23, Orchid Press, 2006, ISBN 974-524-053-2
