= Chiang Mai (disambiguation) =

Chiang Mai (Thai for "New City") is a major city in northern Thailand.

It may also refer to:

- Chiang Mai Initiative
- Chiang Mai International Airport
- Chiang Mai University
- Diocese of Chiang Mai
- Amphoe Mueang Chiang Mai, the central district of Chiang Mai
- Chiang Mai Metropolitan Area, an urban agglomeration in Chiang Mai province
- Chiang Mai Province in Thailand
- Kingdom of Chiang Mai (1802–1899)
- Lanna (1292–1775), also known as the Kingdom of Chiang Mai
- Chiang Mai Lake, another name for the imaginary Lake Chimay
- Chiangmai Sign Language

== See also ==
- Chiang Rai
- Chengmai County
- Si Chiang Mai district
