= Battle of Malacca (1534) =

Date	May 1534
Location	Malacca, Malaysia
Result	Johor victory

Belligerents
Portuguese Empire	Sultanate of Johor

Commanders and leaders
D. Paulo da Gama (DOW)	Lacxemena

Strength
9 or 15 ships	70 ships

Casualties and losses
30 killed The rest were all wounded	Heavy

The Battle of Malacca took place in 1534 between Johor and the Portuguese navy. The battle ended in favor of the Johorese, as they defeated the Portuguese near Malacca, but a strong wind saved the Portuguese from destruction.

== Battle ==
In 1534, the Portuguese governor of Malacca, Dom Paulo da Gama, dispatched 5 men led by Sebastian Vieyra to the Johorese Sultan, Alauddin Riayat Shah II, to establish friendly relations with them. However, the Johorese Sultan, instigated by the Acehnese, had those men surrounded, poured with boiling water until they died, and had the corpses of those men devoured by wild beasts. Enraged by this brutality, the Portuguese dispatched a naval expedition for retaliation. Hearing that some Johorese ships were in Muar River, Paulo dispatched a vessel to confirm this; however, the boat returned being chased to Malacca by 10 ships of Lacxemena who his uncle had sent to assist the Johorese Sultan with 70 vessels. Instantly Paulo set out with 9 or 15 ships to meet the Johorese. The Johorese turned their backs when the Portuguese approached them, not knowing they would fall into a trap. Both sides fought a terrible and bloody battle, the Portuguese showed bravery during the fight, killing many of the Johorese. Almost all Portuguese were killed or badly wounded in the end, and Paulo da Gama was fatally injured and died in Malacca later. Only a strong wind that caused the Johorese fleet to retreat saved the Portuguese from annihilation. They suffered 30 killed and the rest were all wounded. The Memory of the heroic battle was recorded in Malay songs which the Portuguese historian, Diogo do Couto, recorded:

Captain Dom Paulo, baparam de Pungor — Anga dia matu, sita pa tau dor

Captain Dom Paulo fought at Pungor — Instead of giving ground, he preferred to die

== Sources ==
- Frederick Charles Danvers (1894), The Portuguese in India, Being a History of the Rise and Decline of Their Eastern Empire. Vol I.
- Manuel de Faria e Sousa (1695), Portugues Asia, or, the History of the discovery and conquest of India by the Portuguese.
- António Dinis da Cruz e Silva (1817), Poesias, Na arcadia de Lisboa Elpino Nonacriense.
- Georg Schurhammer (1980), Francis Xavier: His Life, his times - vol. 3: Indonesia and India, 1545–1549.
