= Lake Chimay =

Fictional lake in Southeast Asia

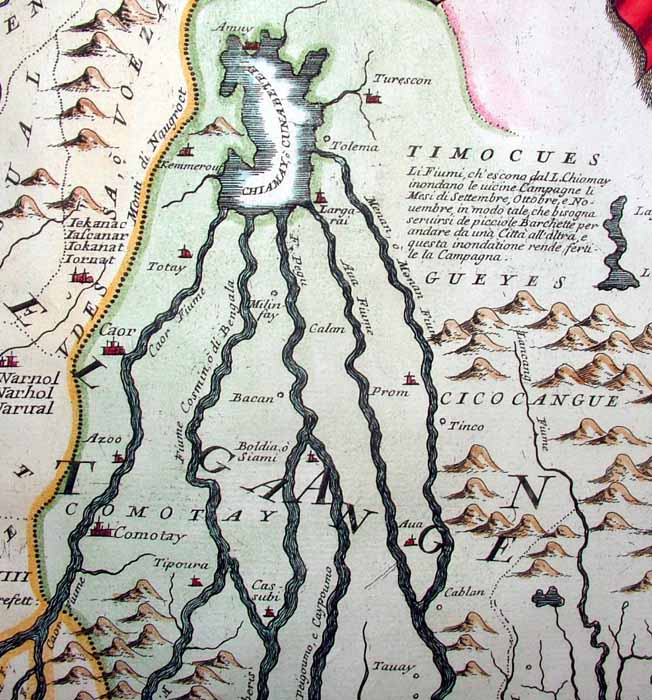
Lake Chiamay or Cunabetee as the source for the rivers Menan/Monan, Ava, Pegu, Cosmin/Bengala, and Caor on a 1692 map of the Mughal Empire by Vincenzo Coronelli.

Lake Chimay or Chiamay, also known by numerous other names, was a fictitious lake or marsh which appeared in European maps of Asia throughout the Age of Discovery. Originating from accounts of Portuguese exploration of Indochina, it was believed to be an enormous lake about 1,100 kilometers (680 mi) inland from which several of the major rivers of Bangladesh, Burma, and Thailand flowed. It continued to appear in European maps, gazetteers, and encyclopedias into the late 18th century.

== Names ==
The name has appeared as Chimay, Cunebetét, Chiamay, Chiammay, Jangamá, Jangoma, Cayamay, Chiama, Jamahey, Chiamai, Chaamay, Chiama, Cunebete, and Singapamor. Given its use in João de Barros and Fernão Mendes Pinto both in reference to the lake or marsh and to the surrounding kingdom and its nearby capital, it appears to have originally taken its name from Chiang Mai, capital of the Kingdom of Lanna.

== History ==
In his Décadas da Ásia, João de Barros mentions the lago Chiamay in his treatment of the term of Lopo Soares de Albergaria, who was governor of Portuguese India in the period 1515–1518. Barros had previously met with Fernão Mendes Pinto, whose journal of his travels in the 1540s was later published, including two passages about a lake either 36 or 180 leagues around surrounded by prosperous mines and possibly originating the Ganges in addition to the other great rivers of the region. As Cayamay Lago, the lake was greatly popularized by the "Ramusio Map", a map of Southeast Asia drafted by Giacomo Gastaldi and used as the third map (Italian: Terza Tavola) in the 1554 second volume of Giovanni Battista Ramusio's Delle Navigationi et Viaggi. Gastaldi gave the lake as the origin of the Brahmaputra, Irrawaddy, Salween, and Chao Phraya.

No major lake has ever existed in the area of Chiang Mai, but—established by Barros and Ramusio's reputations—the lake spread across new European maps as late as 1751 and continued in the form of reprints even longer, at least as late as 1783. During the same period, it continued to be mentioned in gazetteers and encyclopedias, including an entry in the first edition of the Encyclopaedia Britannica.

== See also ==
- History and Geography of Thailand
- History and Geography of Burma
- Age of Discovery
- History of cartography and geography
- Cartography of Asia
