= Décadas da Ásia =

Décadas da Ásia (European Portuguese pronunciation: [ˈdɛkɐðɐʒ ðɐ ˈazjɐ]; Decades of Asia) is a history of the Portuguese in Asia (particularly India) and southeast Africa collected and published by João de Barros between 1552 and 1563, while living abroad. His work was continued by Diogo do Couto and João Baptista Lavanha.

== Publication ==
The first volume of Décadas da Ásia appeared in 1552, and its reception was such that the king straightway ordered Barros to write a chronicle of King Manuel. His many occupations, however, prevented him from undertaking this book, which was finally composed by Damião de Góis. The second Decade came out in 1553 and the third in 1563, but he died before publishing the fourth Decade.

In 1602, Diogo de Couto continued the Décadas, adding nine more volumes to the collection.

The fourth volume of the Décadas was published posthumously in 1615 at Madrid by the Cosmographer and Chronicler-Royal João Baptista Lavanha, who edited and compiled Barros' scattered manuscript.

In 1778–1788, a modern edition of the whole appeared in Lisbon in 14 volumes as Da Ásia de João de Barros, dos feitos que os Portuguezes fizeram no descubrimento e conquista dos mares e terras do Oriente ("About João de Barros' Asia, and what the Portuguese did to discover and conquer the seas and lands of the East"). The edition was accompanied by a volume containing a life of Barros by the historian Manoel Severim de Faria and a copious index of all the Decades.

== Content ==
Décadas da Ásia contains the early history of the Portuguese in India and Asia and reveals careful study of Eastern historians and geographers, as well as of the records of his own country. It is distinguished by clearness of exposition and orderly arrangement, and by the liveliness of the accounts, for example when describing the king of Viantana's killing of the Portuguese ambassadors to Malacca with boiling water and their bodies being fed to the dogs.

== Bibliography ==
- de Barros, João; do Couto, Diogo; Ferguson, Donald (1908). "The History of Ceylan, from the earliest times to 1600 A.D., as related by Joao de Barros and Diogo do Couto". The Journal of the Ceylon Branch of the Royal Asiatic Society of Great Britain & Ireland. 20 (60): 1–445. ISSN 0304-2235. JSTOR 43482993.
