= João Baptista Lavanha =

Portuguese cartographer, mathematician and geographer

João Baptista Lavanha (Portuguese: [lɐˈvɐɲɐ]) (c. 1550 – 31 March 1624) was a Portuguese cartographer, mathematician and geographer in the service of the Spanish kings Philip II and Philip III.

== Life ==
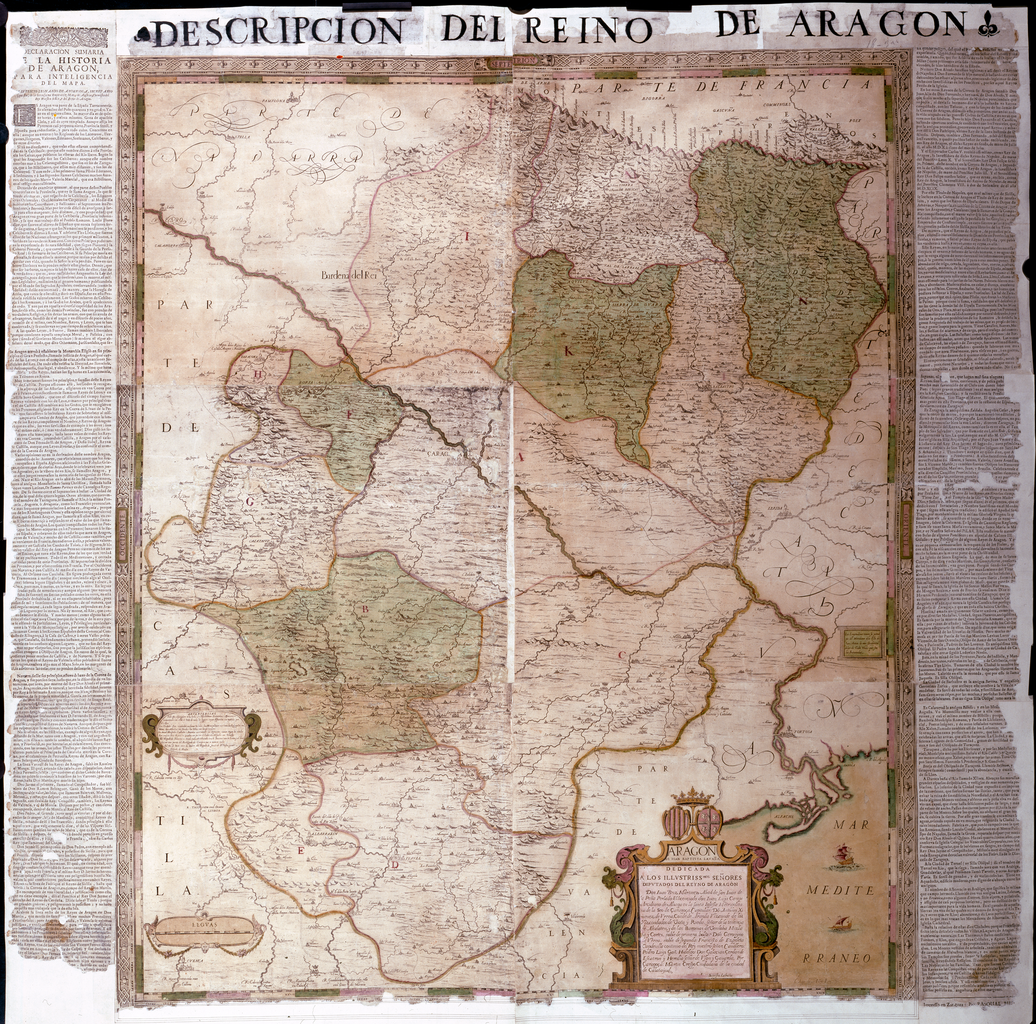
Map of the Kingdom of Aragon

Lavanha was born in the middle of 16th century. His parents were Luís de Lavanha, a gentleman of the Court and Jerónima Dança, who were of Jewish descent. Little is known about his childhood and youth. It is believed that he completed his studies in Rome. He was professor of mathematics of King Sebastian I of Portugal.

At the time of the Portuguese succession crisis of 1580, Philip II of Spain sent troops under the command of Fernando Álvarez de Toledo, 3rd Duke of Alba to subdue Portugal. Philip II understood that navigation studies were more advanced in Portugal than in Spain. To correct this situation, he closed the Paço da Ribeira School, founded by Pedro Nunes in Lisbon which was in charge of the "Mathematical Lessons and Cosmography" and transferred it to Madrid to establish the "Academy of Mathematics and Architecture", named Juan de Herrera as director and hired Lavanha as its first teacher in 1582. He began his classes on 1 January 1583. This institution had as students the playwright Felix Lope de Vega and the writer Miguel de Cervantes.

Lavanha was appointed on 4 November 1586 by the King to the newly created post of Master Engineer of the Kingdom of Portugal, holding teaching duties at the Academy of Mathematics and Architecture in Madrid.

Faced with the illness of Tomás de Orta, he began to serve as the Royal Chief Cosmographer of the Kingdom from 13 February 1591, a position for which he was officially appointed in 1596.

Having lived in Lisbon until 1599, he returned to Madrid, from where he went to Flanders until 1601 in the service of Philip III of Spain. In 1604 he was in Valladolid, from where he departed in 1606 for the execution of major hydraulic works along the Douro River.

In 1609, he received the habit of the Order of Christ, and the questions derived from his Jewish origin were solved by the direct intervention of the sovereign on 10 April 1607.

In 1610, Lavanha began collecting geographic data that allowed him to elaborate in 1615 a map of the province of Aragon. Its detailing was such that his representation lasted until the end of the eighteenth century.

In 1613 he was occupied in the works of water supply to the city of Lisbon and was also appointed as master of Mathematics of the prince and future Philip IV of Spain.

He was named Chief Chronicler of the Kingdom of Portugal on 9 March 1618.

He married Leonarda de Mesquita, with whom he had six children.

== Works ==
Lavanha was the author of works as diverse as a translation of Euclid, the "Nautical Regiment" (1595), where he presents rules for the determination of latitude and tables of declination of the Sun, the "wreck of the Santo Alberto, captained by Julião de Faria Cerveira, off 'Penedo das Fontes' (Kwaaihoek, South Africa) in 1593" (1597), the "First Book of Naval Architecture" (c. 1608), currently in the Library of the Royal Academy of History of Madrid, the "Compendium of Affairs of Spain and Description of the Universe", and unpublished as the "Art of Navigating", the "Treaty of Gnomonics" and finally the "Treaty of the Astrolabe", a copy of which is in the Library of the Astronomical Observatory of Coimbra.

He was master of Pedro Teixeira Albernaz, with whom he worked in several cartographic works. He also worked in the making of nautical instruments, such as astrolabes, quadrants and compasses.

At the request of his heirs, he edited and compiled João de Barros' scattered manuscript into the fourth volume of the "Decades of Asia" and published it in Madrid in 1615.

== Bibliography ==
- Barata, J. O., "Livro Primeiro da Architectura Naval de João Baptista Lavanha". in: Ethnos, vol. IV, Lisboa, 1965.
- Cortesão, Armando. Cartografia e cartógrafos portugueses dos séculos XV e XVII (2v.). Lisboa: 1935. v. II, p. 294-361.
- Perez Sanchez, J. A., Monografía sobre João Baptista Lavanha. Madrid: Academia de Ciencias Exactas, Fisicas y Naturales, 1934.
