= João de Barros =

Portuguese historian (1496 – 1570)

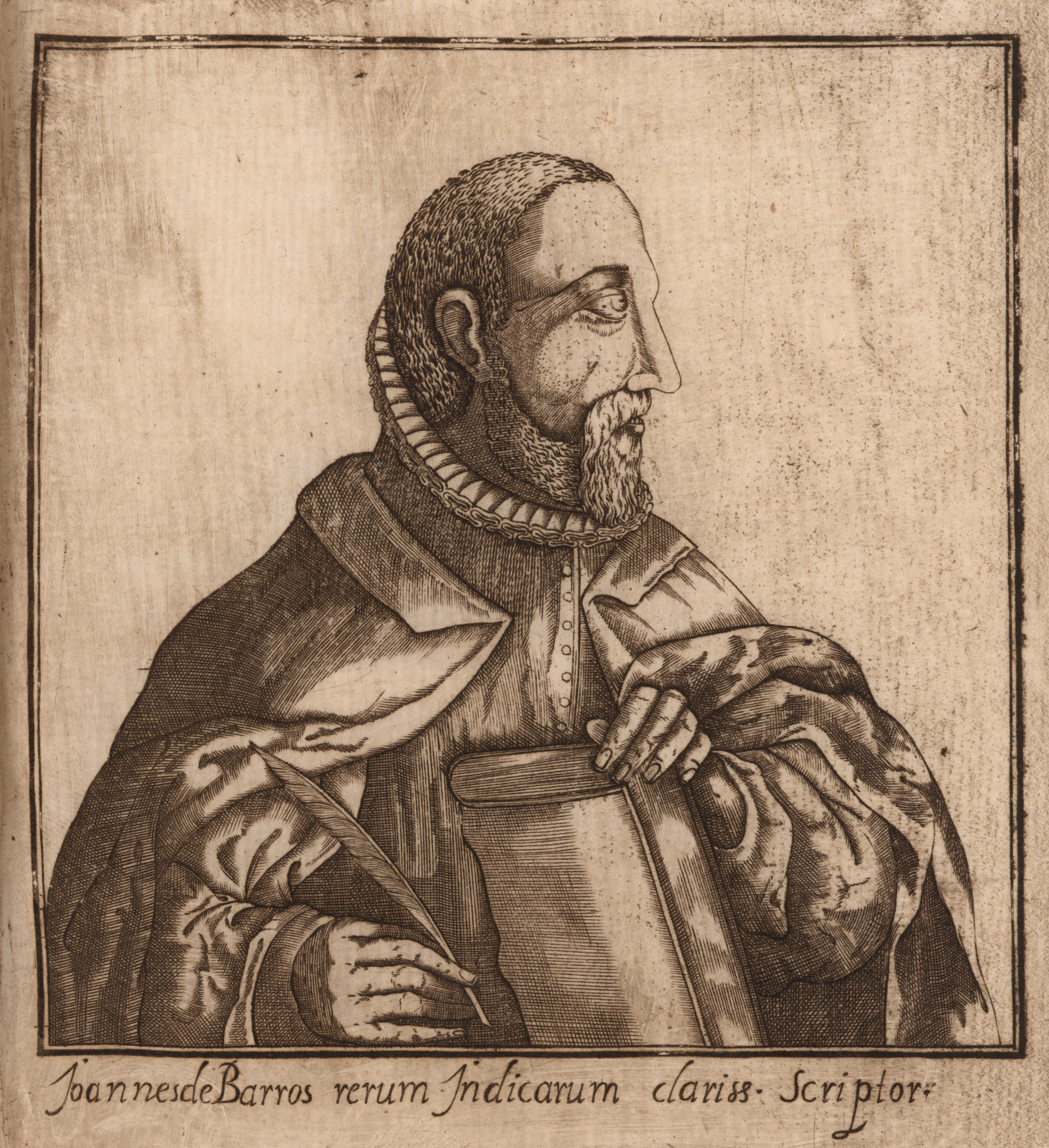
- Born: 1496; Viseu, Kingdom of Portugal
- Died: 20 October 1570 (aged 73–74); Santiago de Litém, Pombal, Kingdom of Portugal
- Occupations: Historian, factor at the Casa da Índia
- Writing career
- Notable works: Decades of Asia, Chronicle of Emperor Clarimund

João de Barros (Portuguese pronunciation: [ʒuˈɐ̃w dɨ ˈβaʁuʃ]; 1496 – 20 October 1570), nicknamed the "Portuguese Livy", is one of the first great Portuguese historians, most famous for his Décadas da Ásia (Decades of Asia), a history of the Portuguese in India, Asia, and southeast Africa.

== Early years ==
João de Barros was born in Viseu, Portugal around 1496. He was the illegitimate son of Lopo de Barros, a squire in the royal household of Manuel I of Portugal and a holder of various judicial posts. Nothing is known of his mother. At a young age his father died and he was placed into service at the royal household, where he became a page to the heir apparent, Dom João, the future João III of Portugal.

Educated in the palace, he composed, at the age of twenty, a romance of chivalry, the Chronicle of the Emperor Clarimundo, in which he is said to have had the assistance of Prince John (later King John III).

Upon ascending the throne, King John III awarded Barros the captaincy of the fortress of St George of Elmina, to which he proceeded in 1524. In 1525, he obtained the post of treasurer of the India House, which he held until 1528.

To escape from an outbreak of bubonic plague in 1530 Barros moved from Lisbon to his country house near Pombal, where he finished a moral dialogue, Rho pica Pneuma, which was praised by Juan Luís Vives. On his return to Lisbon in 1532 the king appointed Barros factor of the "Casa da Índia e da Mina" (House of India and Mina)— a position of great responsibility and importance at a time when Lisbon was the European center for the trade of the East. Barros proved a good administrator, displaying great industry and an honesty rare at the time, with the result that he made little profit compared to his predecessors, who had amassed fortunes.

== The failed captaincy in Brazil and shipwreck ==
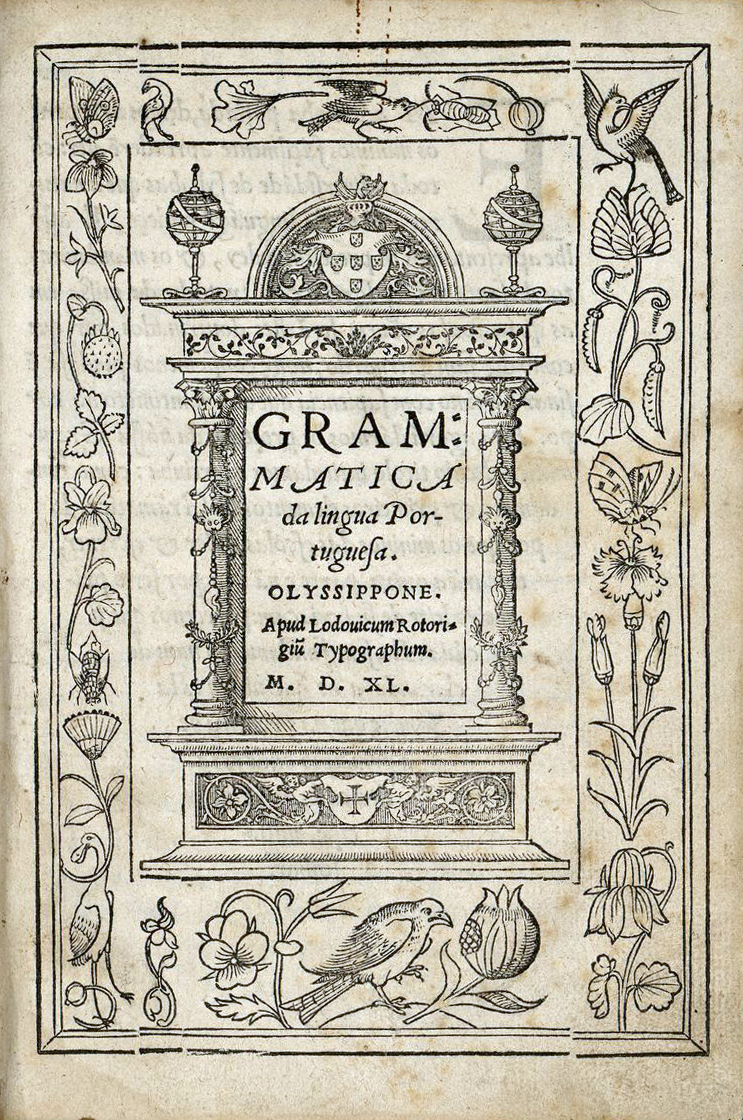
Frontispiece of João de Barros' Grammatica da Lingua Portuguesa, (1539)

In 1534, João III introduced an initiative to encourage the colonization of Brazil. A dozen hereditary captaincies were established along the coast and placed under the governorship of donatários or lord-proprietors. Barros was one of the first to be granted a captaincy at Maranhão. He formed a partnership with two merchants, Aries da Cunha and Alvares de Andrade, and sent an expedition consisting of ten vessels and 900 men to Brazil.

Owing to the ignorance of the pilots, the whole fleet was shipwrecked, which entailed serious financial loss to Barros. As a gesture of goodwill, Barros subsequently paid the debts of those who had perished in the expedition.

During these years he had continued his studies in his leisure hours, and shortly after the Brazilian disaster he offered to write a history of the Portuguese in India, the Décadas da Ásia, which the king accepted. He began work forthwith, but, before printing the first part, he published a Portuguese grammar (1539) and some further moral Dialogues. His 1543 text Diálogo evangélico sobre os artigos da fé contra o Talmud dos Judeus makes anti-Jewish remarks.

== Decades of Asia ==
The first of the Décadas da Ásia ("Decades of Asia") appeared in 1552, and its reception was such that the king straightway charged Barros to write a chronicle of King Manuel. His many occupations, however, prevented him from undertaking this book, which was finally composed by Damião de Góis. The second Decade came out in 1553 and the third in 1563, but he died before publishing the fourth Decade. The latter was published posthumously in 1615 at Madrid by the Cosmographer and Chronicler-Royal Joao Baptista Lavanha, who edited and compiled Barros' scattered manuscript.

His Decades contain the early history of the Portuguese in India and Asia and reveal careful study of Eastern historians and geographers, as well as of the records of his own country. They are distinguished by clearness of exposition and orderly arrangement. They are also lively accounts, for example describing the king of Viantana's killing of the Portuguese ambassadors to Malacca with boiling water and then throwing their bodies to the dogs.

Diogo de Couto continued the Décadas, adding nine more, and a modern edition of the whole appeared in Lisbon in 14 vols. in 1778–1788 as Da Asia de João de Barros, dos feitos que os Portuguezes fizeram no descubrimento e conquista dos mares e terras do Oriente. The edition is accompanied by a volume containing a life of Barros by the historian Manuel Severim de Faria and a copious index of all the Decades.

== Later years ==
In January 1568 Barros retired from his remunerative appointment at the India House, receiving the rank of fidalgo together with a pension and other pecuniary emoluments from King Sebastian, and died on 20 October 1570.

== Works ==
- (1520) Chronica do Emperador Clarimundo, donde os Reys de Portugal descendem, tirada da linguagem ungara em a nossa portugueza.. Coimbra: João da Barreira.
- (1532) Rhopica Pneuma, ou mercadoria espiritual. Lisbon
- (1539) Cartinha para aprender a ler, Lisbon: L. Rodrigues.
- (1540) Grammatica da lingua portuguesa, Lisbon:L. Rodrigues.
- (1540) Dialogo da viciosa vergonha, Lisbon: L. Rodrigues.
- (1540) Dialogo de preceitos moraes com pratica delles em modo de jogo. Lisbon: L. Rodrigues.
- (1543) Diálogo evangélico sobre os artigos da fé contra o Talmud dos Judeus
- (1552) Primeira Década da Ásia, dos feitos que os Portugueses fizeram no descobrimento dos mares e terras do Oriente, Lisbon: Germão Galherde
- (1553) Segunda Década da Ásia &c. Lisbon: Germão Galherde
- (1562) Italian translation of Dec. I & Dec. II by Alfonso Ulloa, l'Asia del S. Giovanni di Barros Consigliero del Christianissimo Re di Portugallo de Fatti de' Portughesi nello scropimento, e conquista de' mari, e terre di Oriente. Venice: Vicenzo, Valgrisio
- (1563) Terceira Década da Ásia &c., Lisbon: João da Barreira.
- (1613) Quarta Década da Ásia &c. (as edited and reworked by cosmógrafo-mor João Baptista Lavanha), Madrid: Imprensa Real.
- (1628) New edition of Dec.I-III. Lisbon: Jorge Rodrigues.
- (1777–78) Da Ásia de João de Barros e Diogo do Couto, dos feitos que os portugueses fizeram no descobrimento dos mares e terras do Oriente, Lisbon: Régia Officina Typografica. (24 volumes; vols. 1-8 are reprints of Dec. I-IV of João de Barros; vol. 9 general index for Barros; vol. 10-23 are reprints of Dec. IV-XII of Diogo do Couto, vol. 24 general index for Couto. online (pdfs)

== Notes ==
| Preceded by Afonso de Albuquerque | Captain-major of Portuguese Gold Coast; 1524 – 1526 | Succeeded by João Vaz de Almada |
