= Diogo do Couto =

Portuguese historian

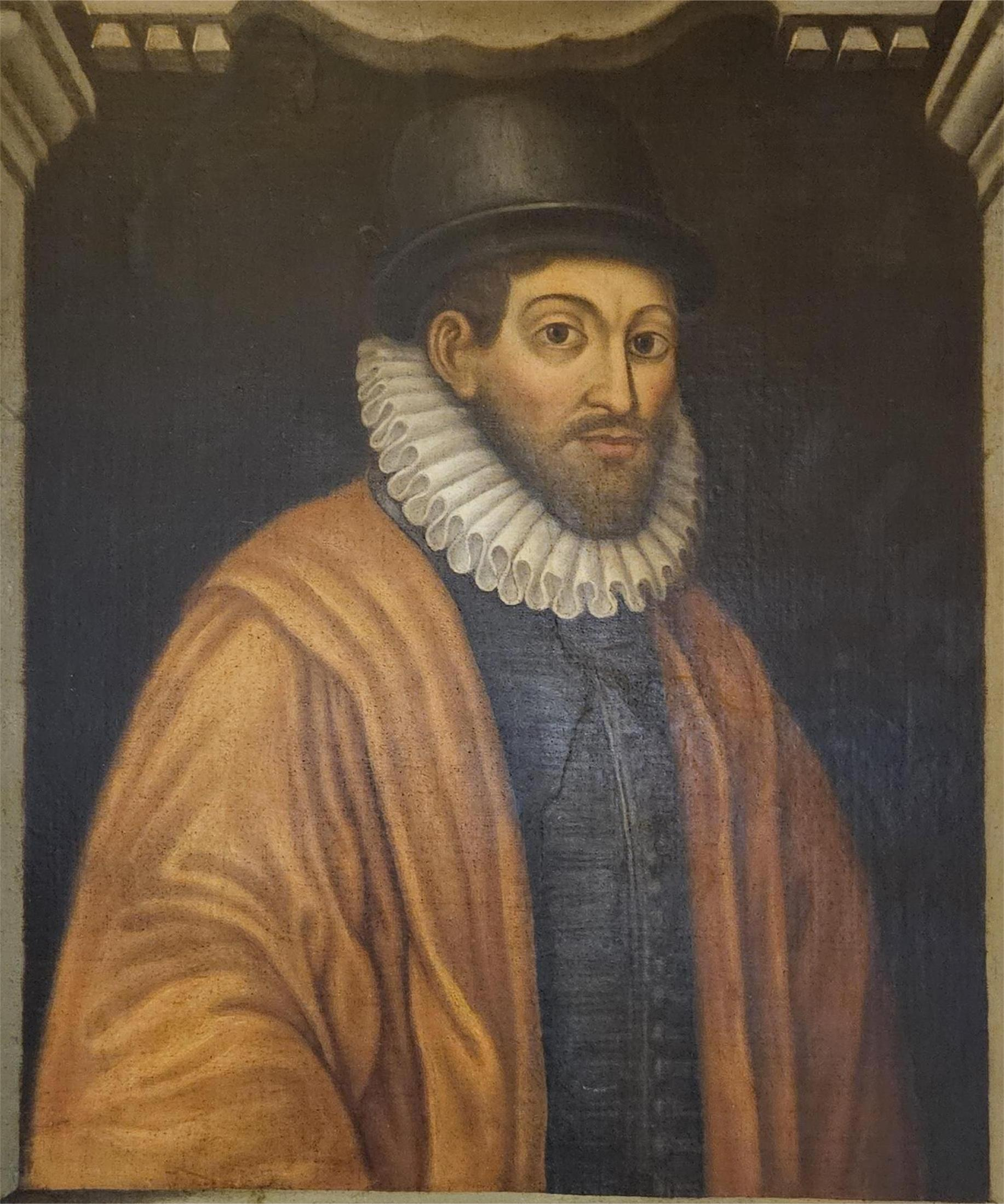
- Portrait of Diogo do Couto (Torre do Tombo)
- Born: c. 1542; Lisbon, Kingdom of Portugal
- Died: 10 December 1616 (aged 73–74); Goa, Portuguese India
- Occupation: Historian
- Spouse: Luísa de Melo

Diogo do Couto (c. 1542 – 10 December 1616) was a Portuguese historian.

== Biography ==
He was born in Lisbon in 1542 to Gaspar do Couto and Isabel Serrão Calvos. He studied Latin and Rhetoric at the College of Saint Anthony the Great (Colégio de Santo Antão), an important Jesuit-run educational institution in Lisbon. He also studied philosophy at the Convent of Saint Dominic (Convento de São Domingos de Benfica) in Benfica.

In March 1559 (Armada of Pêro Vaz de Sequeira) he traveled to Portuguese India. As a soldier he took part in the Surat campaign in March 1560, living in Bharuch in 1563.

He returned to Lisbon with D. António de Noronha in 1569.

He was a close friend of the poet Luís de Camões, and described him in the Island of Mozambique in 1569, as indebted and unable to fund his return to Portugal. Couto and other friends took it upon themselves to help Camões, who was thus enabled to take his most significant work, Os Lusíadas, to the capital.

Diogo's writings label the State of India of his age as sclerotic, decadent and moribund.

Couto arrived in Lisbon on board the Santa Clara in April 1570, only to discover that the port was closed due to the plague. Upon receiving permission from the King of Portugal (whom he met in Almeirim), the ship docked in Tejo.

Shortly after Couto returned to Goa in the Armada of Antão de Noronha, he married Luísa de Melo and worked in a supply warehouse.

In 1595, Couto was invited to organize the Goa archive (being appointed "Guarda-Mor do Tombo da India") and to continue writing the Décadas (a history of the Portuguese in India, Asia, and southeast Africa) of João de Barros. The 4th, 5th, 6th and 7th Décadas were published during his lifetime. After Couto died, his other works were in the hands of his brother-in-law, the priest Deodato da Trindade.

== Works ==
- Decada Quarta (Dos feitos que os portugueses fizeram na conquista e descobrimento das terras e mares do Oriente, em quanto governaram na India Lopo Vaz de Sampaio e parte de Nuno da Cunha), Lisboa 1602;
- Decada Quinta (Dos feitos...em quanto governaram na India Nuno da Cunha, Garcia de Noronha, Estevão da Gama e Martim Afonso de Sousa), Lisboa 1612
- Decada Sexta (Dos feitos...em quanto governaram na India João de Castro, Garcia de Sá, Jorge Cabral e Afonso de Noronha), Lisboa 1614
- Decada Setima (Dos feitos... em quanto governaram na India Pedro de Mascarenhas, Francisco Barreto, Constantino Conde de Redondo, Francisco Coutinho e João de Mendonça), Lisboa 1616;
- Decada Oitava (Dos feitos...em quanto governaram na India Antão de Noronha e Luis de Ataíde), Lisboa 1673 (edited by Joao da Costa e Diogo Soares);
- Decada Nona (written in 1614, and stolen, with the OITAVA);
- Decada Décima (Dos feitos...em quanto governaram na India Fernão Telles, Francisco de Mascarenhas e Duarte de Menezes), Lisboa 1778
- Decada Undecima (lost or stolen, during the lifetime of the author);
- Decada Duodecima ("Tratado os Cinco Livros da Década XII"), Paris 1645;
- "Fala que fez em nome da Câmara de Goa ... a André Furtado Mendonça, em dia do Espírito Santo de 1609" (Lisboa 1810);
- Vida de Paulo de Lima Ferreira, Capitão Mor das Armadas do Estado da India
- O Soldado Prático (the original was stolen, and the author re-made it in 1610, and sent it to Manuel Severim de Faria), Lisboa 1790 (2nd ed. 1954, 3rd ed. 1980);
- Tratado de todas as cousas socedidas ao valeroso Capitão Dom Vasco da Gama primeiro conde da Vidigueira: almirante do mar da India: no descobrimento, e conquista dos mares, e terras do Oriente: e de todas as vezes que ha India passou, e das cousas que socederão nella a todos seus filhos, Lisboa 1998.

== Bibliography ==
- Loureiro, Rui Manuel, A biblioteca de Diogo do Couto, Macau, Instituto Cultural de Macau, 1998.
- Diogo do Couto orador. Discursos oficiais proferidos na Câmara de Goa, edited by Maria Augusta Lima Cruz, Nuno Vila-Santa and Rui Manuel Loureiro, Portimão, Arandis/ISMAT, 2016.
- Vila-Santa, Nuno, "O Primeiro Soldado Prático de Diogo do Couto e os seus contemporâneos" in Memórias 2017, Lisboa, Academia de Marinha, vol. XLVII, 2018, pp. 171–190.
- Vila-Santa, Nuno, "Diogo do Couto e Belchior Nunes Barreto: similitudes e diferenciações de dois interventores políticos contemporâneos" in Diogo do Couto. História e intervenção política de um escritor polémico, Edições Humus, Vila Nova de Famalicão, 2019, pp. 191–220.
