= Óbidos Aqueduct =

16th-century aqueduct in Óbidos, Portugal

- Aqueducto da Óbidos
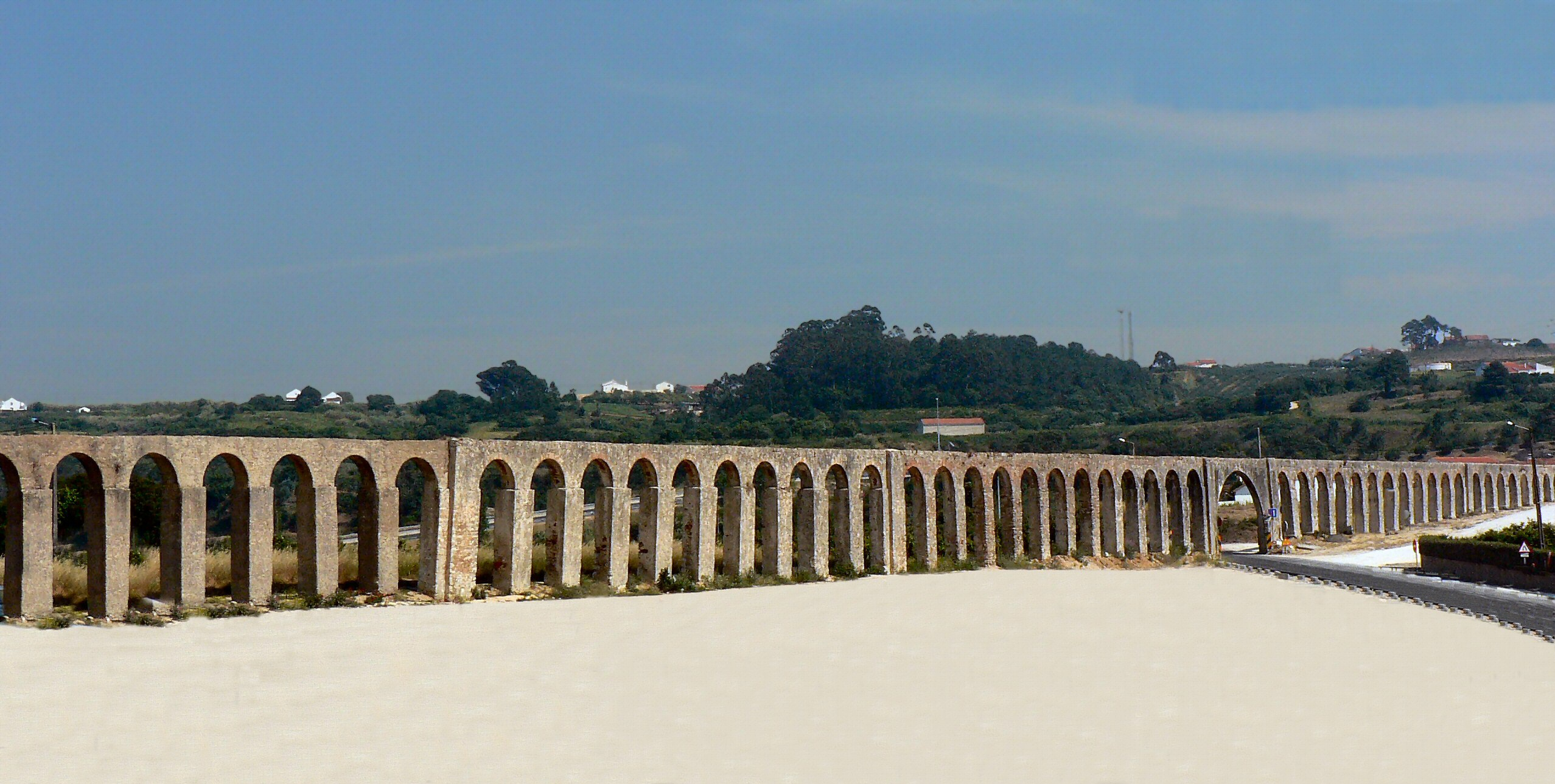
- Interactive map of the Óbidos Aqueduct area

General information
- Type: Aqueduct
- Architectural style: Medieval
- Location: Óbidos, Portugal
- Coordinates: 39°21′28.01″N 9°9′25.99″W
- Opened: 1570
- Owner: Portuguese Republic

Technical details
- Material: Mortared stone masonry

Design and construction
- Architect: Catherine of Austria (1570)

The Óbidos Aqueduct (Portuguese: Aqueduto de Óbidos) is a 16th-century aqueduct that spans the Portuguese municipality of Óbidos.

== History ==
The Óbidos Aqueduct was built at the orders of Catherine of Austria in around 1570. It has been classified as a Property of Public Interest since 1962.
