= Hereditary Prince of Portugal =

Heir/heiress apparent or presumptive to the Kingdom of Portugal (1433-1645)

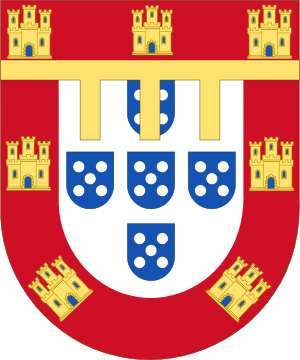
Coat of arms (1433—1645)

Hereditary Prince of Portugal (Portuguese: Príncipe Herdeiro de Portugal), unofficially Prince of Portugal (Príncipe Herdeiro de Portugal), or Princess of Portugal, was the title held by the heirs apparent and heirs presumptive to the Kingdom of Portugal, from 1433 to 1645.

The title differs from the title Infante of Portugal, which is the title given to all children of the monarch except the first in the line of succession, and is often translated into English as "prince".

== History ==
Due to English tradition introduced to the Portuguese court by Philippa of Lancaster, her son King Edward sought to create a princely title for the heir apparent, much like the Prince of Wales, to distinguish him from his siblings, who were infantes. Until that time, the heir apparent was also titled infante.

In 1433 Edward granted the title of Prince of Portugal to his eldest son, the future King Afonso V. The monarchies of Castile, Aragon and England already had princely titles for their heirs apparent and now Portugal had one, so that foreign powers would not underestimate the prestige of the kingdom.

In 1645, the title was replaced with Prince of Brazil.

== List of holders ==
Name	Lifespan	Tenure	Notes	Parents	Portrait	Heir To
Afonso	15 January 1432 – 28 August 1481	1433 – 13 September 1438	Later: King Afonso V of Portugal and the Algarves	Edward of Portugal; Eleanor of Aragon		Edward
Ferdinand	17 November 1433 - 18 September 1470	(1st Time); 13 September 1438 – 29 January 1451 (2nd Time); 1451 – 6 February 1452	Also: Duke of Beja and Duke of Viseu	Edward of Portugal; Eleanor of Aragon		Afonso V
John	29 January 1451 – 1451	29 January 1451 – 1451	Premature death	Afonso V of Portugal; Isabella of Coimbra		Afonso V
Joanna	6 February 1452 – 12 May 1490	6 February 1452 – 3 March 1455	Also: Saint Princess Joanna of Portugal	Afonso V of Portugal; Isabella of Coimbra		Afonso V
John	3 March 1455 – 25 October 1495	(1st Time); 3 March 1455 – 11 November 1477 (2nd Time); 15 November 1477 – 28 August 1481	Later: King John II of Portugal and the Algarves	Afonso V of Portugal; Isabella of Coimbra		Afonso V
Afonso	18 May 1475 – 13 July 1491	(1st Time); 11 November 1477 – 15 November 1477 (2nd Time); 28 August 1481 – 13 July 1491	Premature death	John II of Portugal; Eleanor of Viseu		John II
Manuel	31 May 1469 – 13 December 1521	13 July 1491 – 25 October 1495	Later: King Manuel I of Portugal and the Algarves	Ferdinand, Duke of Viseu; Beatrice of Portugal		John II
Miguel da Paz	23 August 1498 – 19 July 1500	23 August 1498 – 19 July 1500	Premature death	Manuel I of Portugal; Isabella of Aragon		Manuel I
John	7 June 1502 – 11 June 1557	7 June 1502 – 13 December 1521	Later: King João III of Portugal and the Algarves	Manuel I of Portugal; Maria of Aragon		Manuel I
Louis	3 March 1506 – 27 November 1555	(1st time); 13 December 1521 – 24 February 1526 (2nd time); 12 April 1526 – 15 October 1527	Also: Duke of Beja	Manuel I of Portugal; Maria of Aragon		John III
Afonso	24 February 1526 – 12 April 1526	24 February 1526 – 12 April 1526	Premature death	John III of Portugal; Catherine of Austria		John III
Maria Manuela	15 October 1527 – 12 August 1545	15 October 1527 – 11 November 1531	Also: Maria Manuela, Princess of Asturias	John III of Portugal; Catherine of Austria		John III
Manuel	11 November 1531 – 14 April 1537	11 November 1531 – 14 April 1537	Premature death	John III of Portugal; Catherine of Austria		John III
Philip	25 March 1533 – 29 April 1539	14 April 1537 – 29 April 1539	Premature death	John III of Portugal; Catherine of Austria		John III
João Manuel	3 June 1537 – 2 January 1554	29 April 1539 – 2 January 1554	Premature death	John III of Portugal; Catherine of Austria		John III
Sebastian	20 January 1554 – 4 August 1578	20 January 1554 – 11 June 1557	Later: King Sebastian of Portugal and the Algarves	John Manuel, Prince of Portugal; Joanna of Austria		John III
Diego	15 August 1575 – 21 November 1582	25 March 1581 – 21 November 1582	Premature death	Philip I of Portugal; Anna of Austria		Philip I
Philip	14 April 1578 – 31 March 1621	21 November 1582 – 13 September 1598	Later: King Philip II of Portugal and the Algarves	Philip I of Portugal; Anna of Austria		Philip I
Anne	22 September 1601 – 20 January 1666	22 September 1601 – 8 April 1605	Also: Queen Anne of France and Navarre	Philip II of Portugal; Margaret of Austria		Philip II
Philip	8 April 1605 – 17 September 1665	8 April 1605 – 31 March 1621	Later: King Philip III of Portugal and the Algarves	Philip II of Portugal; Margaret of Austria		Philip II
Balthasar Charles	17 October 1629 – 9 October 1646	8 April 1605 – 1 December 1640	House deposed	Philip III of Portugal; Elisabeth of France		Philip III
Theodosius	17 October 1629 – 9 October 1646	8 April 1605 – 27 October 1645	Title change	John IV of Portugal; Luisa de Guzmán		John IV

== See also ==
- Manuel, Prince Hereditary of Portugal, illegitimate son of António, Prior of Crato
