= Maria Manuela, Princess of Portugal =

Princess of Asturias

Maria Manuela
- Princess of Portugal, Princess of Asturias
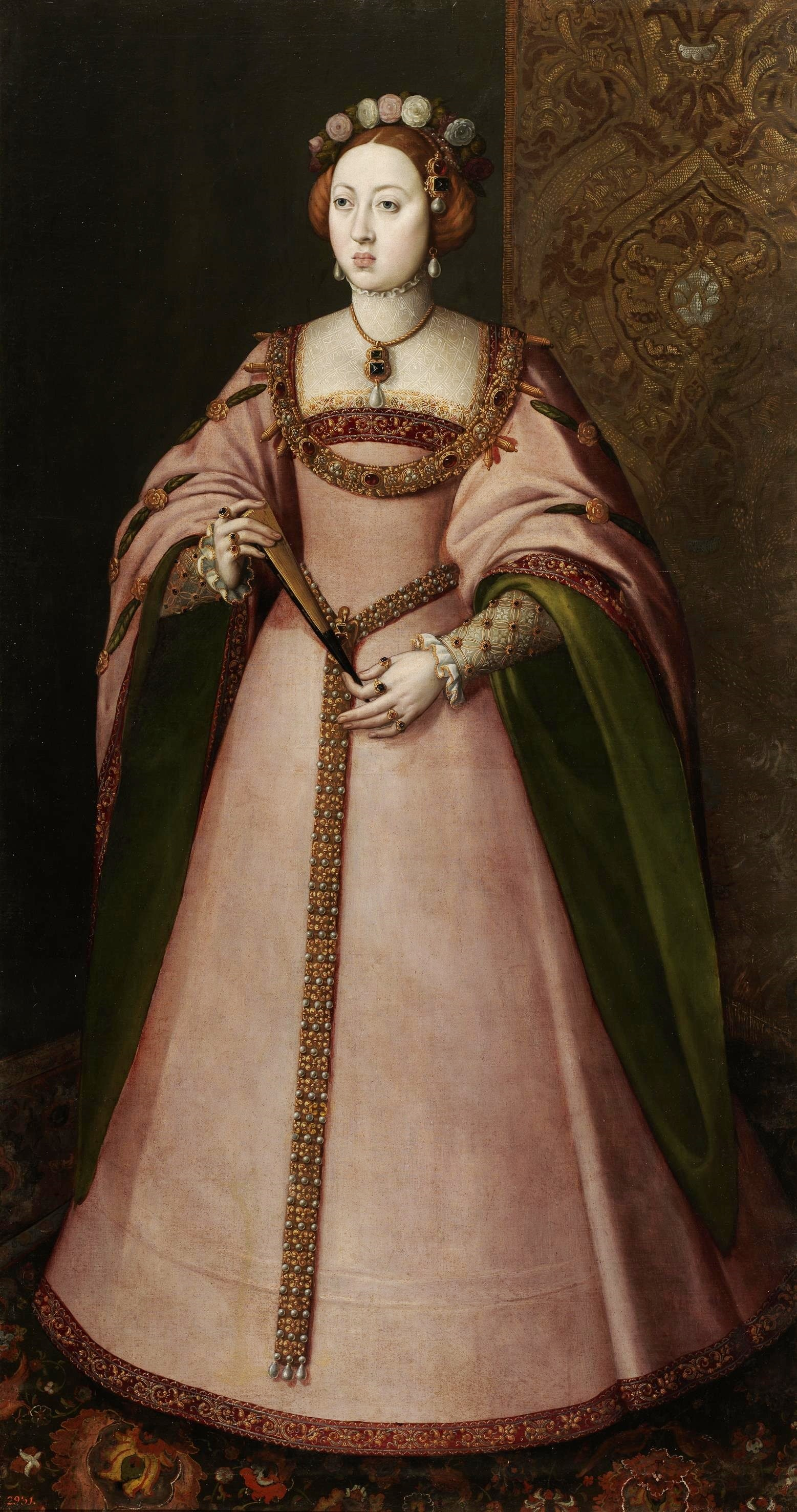
- Portrait by Antonis Mor

Duchess consort of Milan
- Tenure: 12 November 1543 – 12 July 1545
- Born: 15 October 1527; Coimbra
- Died: 12 July 1545 (aged 17); Valladolid
- Burial: El Escorial
- Spouse: Philip, Prince of Asturias (later Philip II of Spain) (m. 1543)
- Issue: Carlos, Prince of Asturias
- House: Aviz
- Father: John III of Portugal
- Mother: Catherine of Austria

Doña Maria Manuela (15 October 1527 – 12 July 1545) was the eldest daughter and second child of King John III of Portugal and Catherine of Austria. She was Princess of Asturias and Duchess of Milan as the first wife of the future Philip II of Spain, and Princess of Portugal as heir presumptive to the Portuguese throne between 1527 and 1535.

== Early life ==
Maria was born in Coimbra on 15 October 1527 and was one of the two children of John III to survive childhood. In her youth, she received a humanistic education that was considered typical for a princess of her time.

== Marriage and later life ==
She married her double first cousin Philip II of Spain on 12 November 1543 at Salamanca. As she was to be married to the Prince of Asturias, heir apparent to the Spanish crown, and being an Infanta of Portugal, their wedding became one of the most remarkable in the history of Spain due to its opulence. Contemporary writers have left detailed descriptions of the journey from Madrid to Badajoz to Salamanca to receive the princess and of the luxuries she was given by the Duke of Medina Sidonia in Badajoz.

She gave birth to their son Carlos on 8 July 1545 in Valladolid, but died four days later due to a haemorrhage. She was initially buried in the Royal Chapel of Granada on 30 March 1549 but was later transferred to Royal Crypt of the Monastery of El Escorial.

== Ancestry ==
Coat of arms of Maria Manuela of Portugal as Princess of Asturias

Ancestors of Maria Manuela of Portugal

8. Ferdinand, Duke of Viseu
4. Manuel I of Portugal
9. Beatrice of Portugal
2. John III of Portugal
10. Ferdinand II of Aragon
5. Maria of Aragon
11. Isabella I of Castile
1. Maria Manuela of Portugal
12. Maximilian I, Holy Roman Emperor
6. Philip I of Castile
13. Mary, Duchess of Burgundy
3. Catherine of Austria
14. Ferdinand II of Aragon (= 10)
7. Joanna I of Castile
15. Isabella I of Castile (= 11)

== Notes ==
Maria Manuela, Princess of Portugal House of Aviz Cadet branch of the House of Burgundy Born: 15 October 1527 Died: 12 August 1545
Portuguese royalty
Preceded by Afonso	Princess of Portugal; 1527–1535	Succeeded by Manuel
