= María de Ulloa =

Spanish noblewoman (d. 1548)

- Born: Toro, Crown of Castile
- Died: 1548
- Spouse(s): Diego Gómez de Sarmiento
- Issue: Diego Gómez de Sarmiento y Villandrando, Count of Salinas and Ribadeo; Ana Sarmiento, Countess of Ribagorza; Marina Sarmiento; Alfonso Sarmiento
- Father: Rodrigo de Ulloa
- Mother: Aldonza de Castilla

María de Ulloa (d. 1548) was a noblewoman from the Kingdom of León in the Crown of Castile. She is best known for serving as the camarera mayor (chief lady-in-waiting) to Queen Joanna of Castile during a politically turbulent period in early 16th-century.

== Early life and family ==
María de Ulloa was likely born in Toro before 1473. Her father, Rodrigo de Ulloa, held several important offices, including warden of the fortress of Toro and High Treasurer under King Henry IV and the Catholic Monarchs. Her mother, Aldonza de Castilla, was the daughter of Pedro de Castilla (1394–1461), bishop of Osma and Palencia and a grandson of King Peter of Castile, and Isabel de Drochelín, a lady-in-waiting to Queen Catherine of Lancaster.

In 1484, her marriage was arranged to Diego Gómez de Sarmiento, heir to the Count of Salinas. Her husband and father-in-law had both died by 1506, by which time her eldest son held the title of Count of Salinas. María and her son were involved in a legal dispute over the family inheritance with her mother-in-law and siblings in-laws.

== Court life and political role ==
María's political influence grew in 1506, following the death of King Philip I of Castile. She joined the retinue of his widow, Queen Joanna, and quickly became a trusted companion. María acted as a loyal protector of the queen, shielding her from opponents of Joanna’s father, Ferdinand II of Aragon, who sought to govern Castile in her name.

In the absence of a midwife during Queen Joanna’s stay in Torquemada, María personally assisted the queen in giving birth to her last child, Catherine of Austria.

Ferdinand returned to Castile in 1507. María remained close to Queen Joanna, even after her confinement at Tordesillas. In gratitude for her loyalty, Ferdinand granted her the habit of the Order of Santiago and appointed her as camarera mayor (chief lady-in-waiting).

In August 1511, Luis Ferrer informed King Ferdinand that Queen Joanna had become angry at María for leaving the palace frequently to handle personal matters. This did not affect her position, and she remained in service until Ferdinand’s death in 1516. That same year, she wrote to Cardinal Cisneros, claiming to have endured "suffering no slave could bear."

Later that year, she denounced a power struggle between her cousin Diego de Castilla and Luis Ferrer, who were competing for control over Queen Joanna’s household. María left her post at some point in 1516 and was not replaced.

Later years On March 14, 1516, Prince Charles I of Spain declared himself king alongside his mother, Queen Joanna. María de Ulloa opposed this act and delayed the public proclamation of Charles as king until May.

In 1518, she formally emancipated her son Diego Gómez de Sarmiento. In her later years, she retired to the Convent of Santo Domingo el Real in Madrid, which had familial ties to her royal ancestor, King Peter of Castile.

In 1528, Emperor Charles V considered replacing Guiomar de Melo as chief lady-in-waiting to Empress Isabella of Portugal. María de Ulloa was among the women considered for the role, though no changes were made.

She signed her will on September 19, 1547. The document was opened in 1548, confirming her death that year.

== Marriage and children ==
María de Ulloa and Diego Gómez de Sarmiento had four children:

- Diego Gómez de Sarmiento y Villandrando (d. 1561), Count of Salinas and Ribadeo. Married Brianda de la Cerda in 1519 despite opposition from Ferdinand the Catholic.
- Marina Sarmiento, whose engagement to Antonio de Padilla, Adelantado mayor de Castilla, was annulled by King Ferdinand. She later became a nun at the Monastery of Sancti Spiritus in Toro.
- Ana Sarmiento, married Alfonso of Aragon, Count of Ribagorza, in 1517. She acted as governor of the county during her son's absence (1554–1559) and died in 1576.
- Alfonso Sarmiento, who predeceased his mother.
