= Manuel, Hereditary Prince of Portugal (1531–1537) =

Manuel
- Hereditary Prince of Portugal
- Born: 11 November 1531; Alvito, Kingdom of Portugal
- Died: 14 April 1537 (age 5); Évora, Kingdom of Portugal
- House: Aviz
- Father: John III of Portugal
- Mother: Catherine of Austria

Manuel (11 November 1531 – 14 April 1537), was the Hereditary Prince of Portugal from 1535 to his death in 1537. He was the fifth child and second son of king John III of Portugal and Catherine of Austria.

In 1535, his father officially designated him as Prince of Portugal, taking the place of his eldest sister Infanta Maria Manuela. However, after his premature death at five years old, his younger brother Infante Filipe became the next Prince of Portugal.

== Ancestry ==
Ancestors of Manuel, Hereditary Prince of Portugal (1531–1537)

8. Ferdinand, Duke of Viseu
4. Manuel I of Portugal
9. Beatrice of Portugal
2. John III of Portugal
10. Ferdinand II of Aragon
5. Maria of Aragon
11. Isabella I of Castile
1. Manuel, Hereditary Prince of Portugal
12. Maximilian I, Holy Roman Emperor
6. Philip the Handsome, King of Castile
13. Mary, Duchess of Burgundy
3. Catherine of Austria
14. Ferdinand II of Aragon (= 10)
7. Joanna I of Castile
15. Isabella I of Castile (= 11)

Manuel, Hereditary Prince of Portugal (1531–1537) House of Aviz Cadet branch of the House of Burgundy Born: 11 November 1531 Died: 14 April 1537
Preceded by Maria Manuela	Hereditary Prince of Portugal; 1535–1537	Succeeded by Filipe
