= Master of Affligem =

Painter

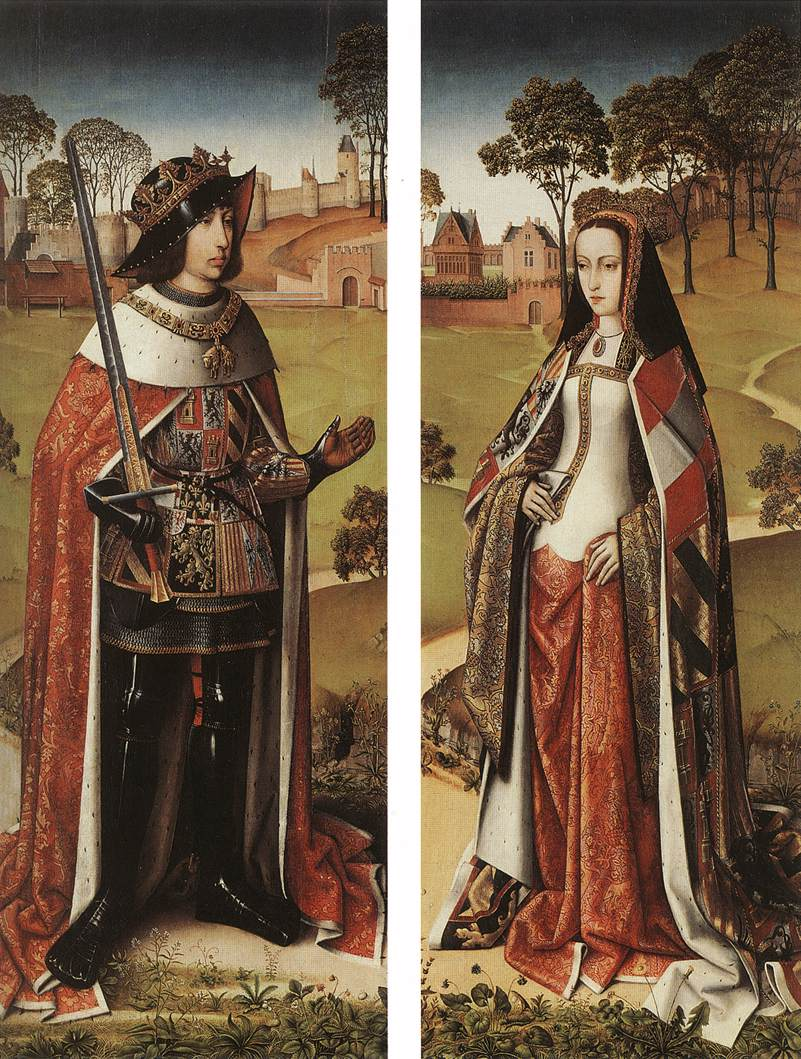
Philip the Handsome and Joanna the Mad, of Castile, c. 1500: details from the wings of the Last Judgement Triptych of Zierikzee, by the Master of Affligem (Royal Museums of Fine Arts of Belgium)

The Master of Affligem or Master of the Joseph Sequence (working c. 1470–1500) was an accomplished painter of the South Netherlandish school, apparently working in Brussels, whose name is not known, but whose hand can be detected in a number of surviving paintings on panel. The pseudonym Master of the Joseph Sequence was given him as a name of convenience in 1923 by Walter Friedländer, who identified a series of tondi illustrating the Legend of St Joseph, which had become scattered among several museums, as all coming from the same painter. Subsequently Friedländer attributed to the same workshop eight further panels with scenes from two other sequences, the Life of Christ and the Life of the Virgin (c. 1493–1508; Brussels, Musée d'Art Ancien) These came from the abbey of Affligem in Brabant, providing the alternate name for the artist.

The portraits of Philip the Handsome and Joanna the Mad on the wings of the Last Judgement triptych from Zierikzee (c. 1500, Royal Museums of Fine Arts of Belgium, illustrated) and the wings of a Legend of St Barbara, depicting Saint Barbara Directing the Construction of a Third Window to her tower and the Martyrdom of Saint Barbara in the Walters Art Museum, Baltimore, are also attributed to this artist.

== Gallery ==
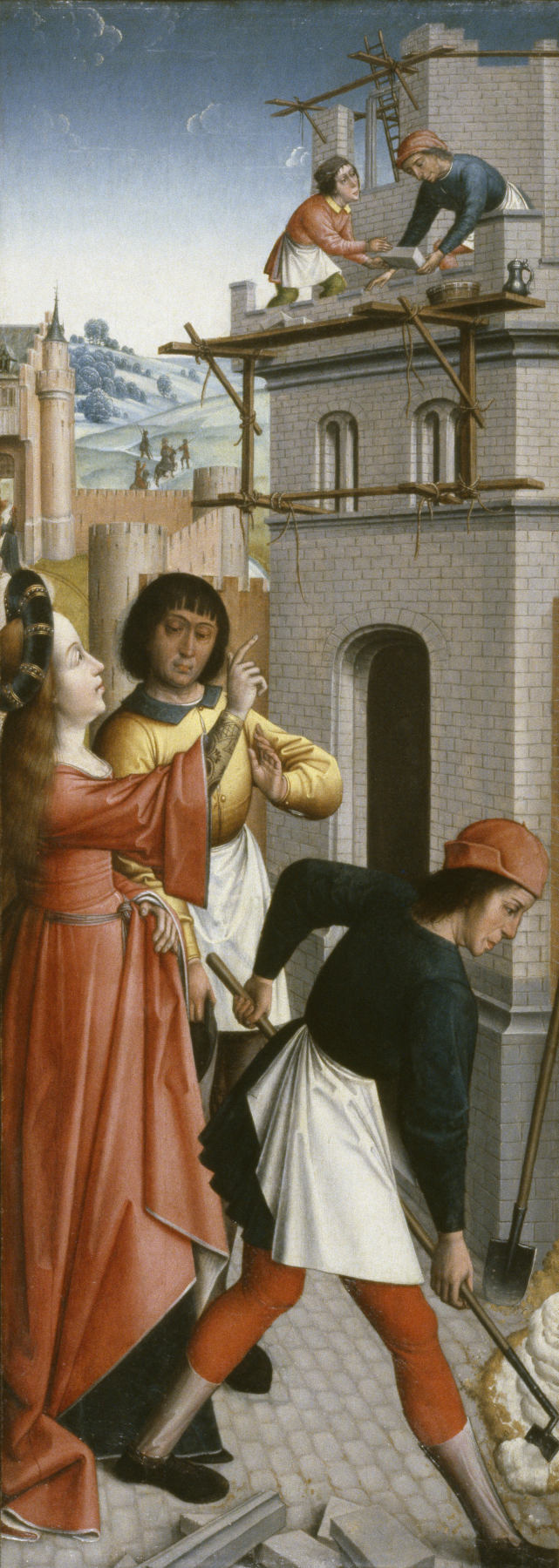
St Barbara Directing the Construction of a Third Window in Her Tower. The Walters Art Museum

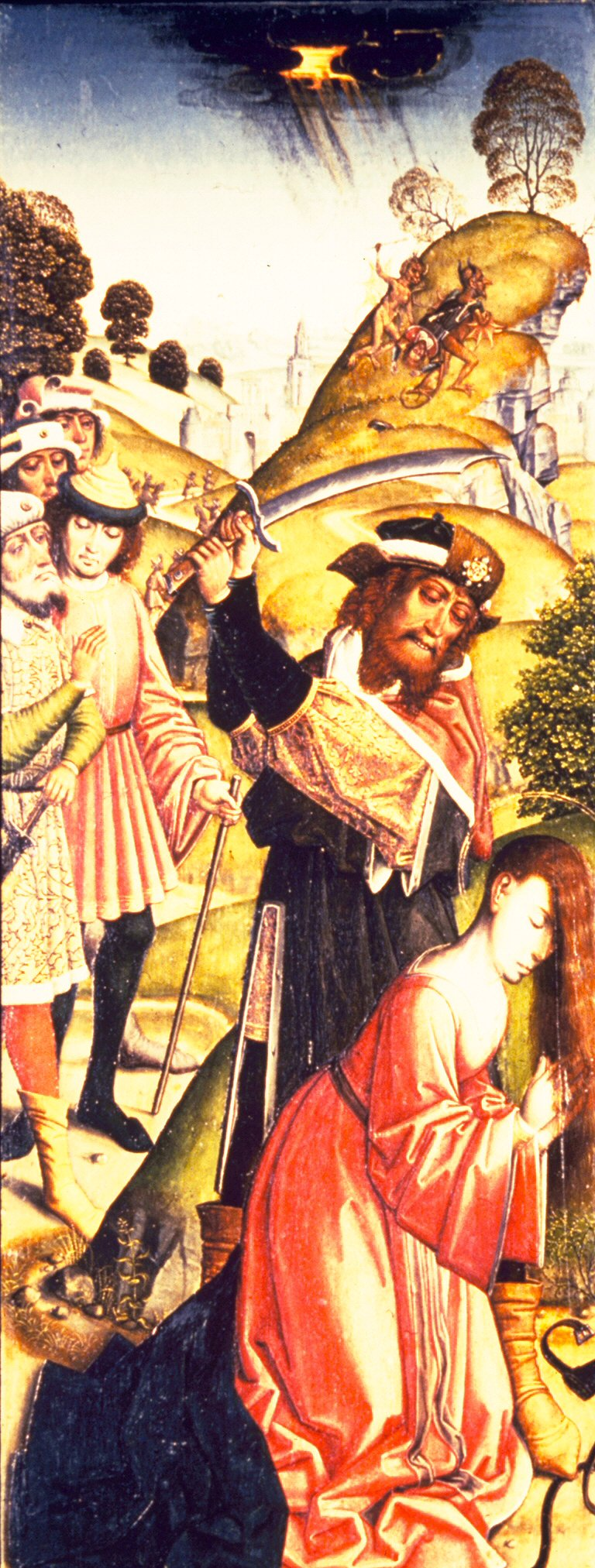
The Martyrdom of St Barbara. The Walters Art Museum
