= Afonso, Hereditary Prince of Portugal (1526) =

Afonso
- Hereditary Prince of Portugal
- Born: 24 February 1526
- Died: 12 April 1526
- House: Aviz
- Father: John III of Portugal
- Mother: Catherine of Austria

Afonso, Hereditary Prince of Portugal was the first son of king John III of Portugal and his queen, Catherine of Austria. He was the Prince of Portugal but died in the same year he was born, in 1526.

Afonso, Hereditary Prince of Portugal (1526) House of Aviz Cadet branch of the House of Burgundy Born: 24 February 1526 Died: 12 April 1526
Preceded by John (became John III)	Hereditary Prince of Portugal; 1526 – 1526	Succeeded by Maria Manuela
