= Torquemada, Palencia =

Coordinates: 42.032°N 4.320°W

Torquemada
- municipality
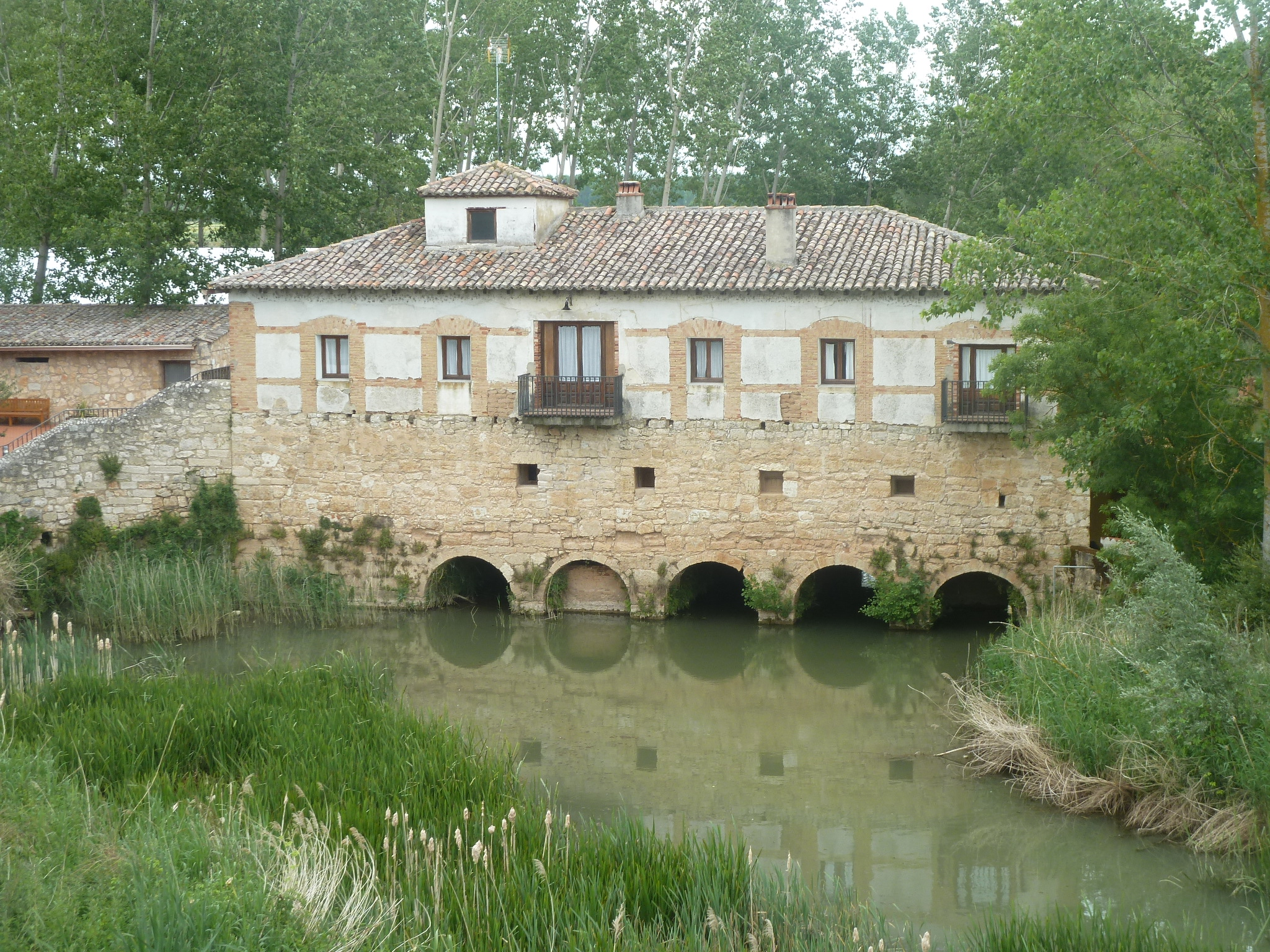

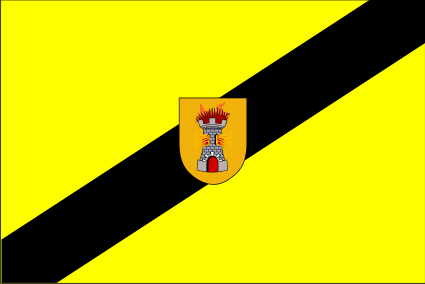
- Flag Coat of arms
- Interactive map of Torquemada
- Country: Spain
- Autonomous community: Castile and León
- Province: Palencia
- Municipality: Torquemada

Area
  - Total: 83.63 km^{2} (32.29 sq mi)
- Elevation: 741 m (2,431 ft)

Population (2025-01-01)
  - Total: 964
  - Density: 11.5/km^{2} (29.9/sq mi)
- Time zone: UTC+1 (CET)
  - Summer (DST): UTC+2 (CEST)
- Website: Official website

Torquemada is a municipality in the province of Palencia, Castile and León, Spain. According to the 2010 census (INE), the municipality had a population of 1098 inhabitants. It is the namesake and believed to be the birthplace of famed Grand Inquisitor Tomas de Torquemada.

The village is known for its peppers, an important crop for the local economy.

== Etymology ==
The village name came from Latin turris cremata "burnt tower".

== Curiosities and historical data ==
The Infanta Catalina was born here on January 14, 1507. She was the daughter of Queen Juana of Castile and Felipe of Habsburg. After Felipe's death, his remains rested here for a period of 3 months.

In this village is the home of the writer José Zorrilla y Moral, author of "Don Juan Tenorio", traditionally performed every year on All Saints Day. There is a plaque in Zorrilla's memory, located in front of his summer residence.

In the summer of 2007, the "Ruta Quetzal" passed by here, in honor of the 500th anniversary of the birth of the Infanta Catalina.
