= Cristóvão Lopes =

Portuguese painter

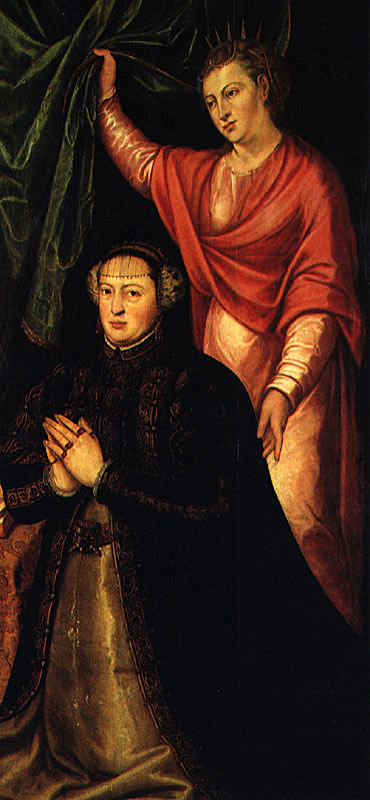
Portrait of Queen Catherine (kneeling) by Cristóvão Lopes, at the National Museum of Ancient Art.

Cristóvão Lopes (c. 1516–1594) was a Portuguese painter.

Cristóvão Lopes was the son and disciple of royal painter Gregório Lopes, who died in 1550. Cristóvão succeeded his father as the royal painter of King John III in 1551. Since no works are known by him before the death of his father, it is assumed that up to this time Cristóvão worked in his father's workshop.

Few paintings are certainly by his hand, since he did not sign his works. Cristóvão Lopes' painting style suggest that he may have worked with Dutch portrait painter Antonis Mor (also known as Antonio Moro) who had come to Portugal in the 1550s to paint the royal family.

Cristóvão Lopes is the painter of an altarpiece for the Convent of Madre de Deus in Lisbon, in the high choir of the church, which carry portraits of the royal couple, John III and his wife Catherine of Austria (or Habsburg). Other royal portraits attributed to him are now on display in the National Museum of Ancient Art, in Lisbon. He is also the painter of an allegory of Mercy for the Misericórdia Church in Sesimbra.

== Anthology of major works ==
Since Lopes did not sign his works, many of these paintings are only attributed to him (or to his workshop). Many were copies of the works of others, such as of Antonis Mor.

- Portrait Queen Catherine of Austria, wife of King John III of Portugal (c. 1550-1560; attributed) - Oil on wood, 65.0 x 50.5 cm, Museu de S. Roque, Lisbon, inv. 50; see image gallery below.
- Portrait King John III of Portugal (c. 1550-1560; attributed) - Oil on wood, 65.0 x 50.5 cm, Museu de S. Roque, Lisbon, inv. 51; see image gallery below.
- Portrait Queen Catherine of Austria with St. Catherine (c. 1552-1571; attributed) - Oil on wood, 198.2 x 150 cm, Convent of Madre de Deus, Lisbon, inv. PINT 1; see image gallery below.
- Portrait King John III of Portugal with St. John the Baptist (c. 1552-1571; attributed) - Oil on wood, 199 x 147.3 cm, Convent of Madre de Deus, Lisbon, inv. PINT 2;see image gallery below.
- Portrait Queen Catherine of Austria with St. Catherine (c. 1552-1571; workshop attribution) - Oil on wood, 177.5 x 84 cm, Museu Nacional de Arte Antiga, Lisbon, inv. 968; provenance: Convent of Nossa Senhora da Esperança, Lisbon; see image gallery below.
- Portrait King John III of Portugal with St. John the Baptist (c. 1552-1571; workshop attribution) - Oil on wood, 177 x 91.5 cm, Museu Nacional de Arte Antiga, Lisbon, inv. 967; provenance: Convent of Nossa Senhora da Esperança, Lisbon; see image gallery below.
- Allegory of Mercy, Igreja da Misericórdia, Sesimbra.

== Gallery ==
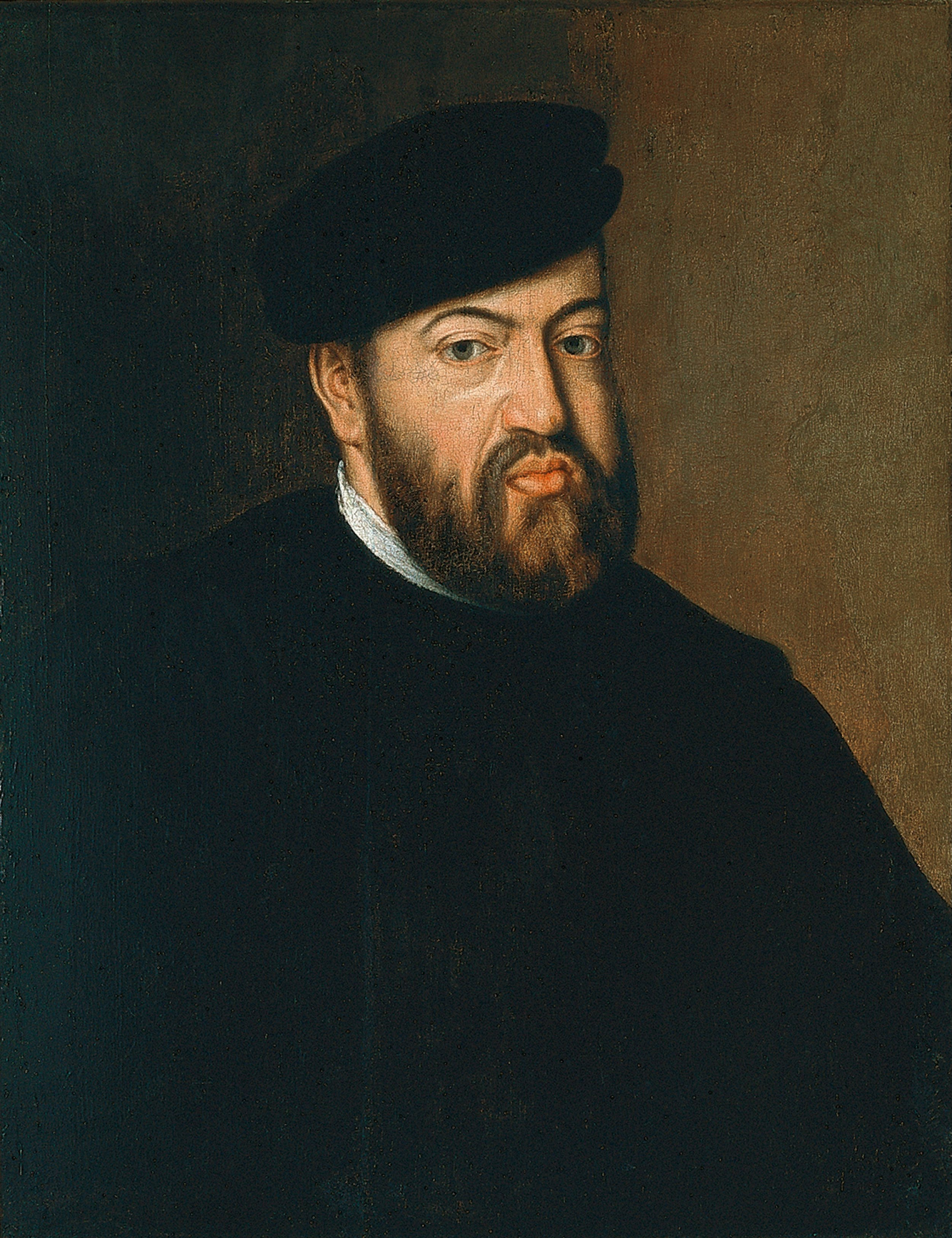
King John III of Portugal

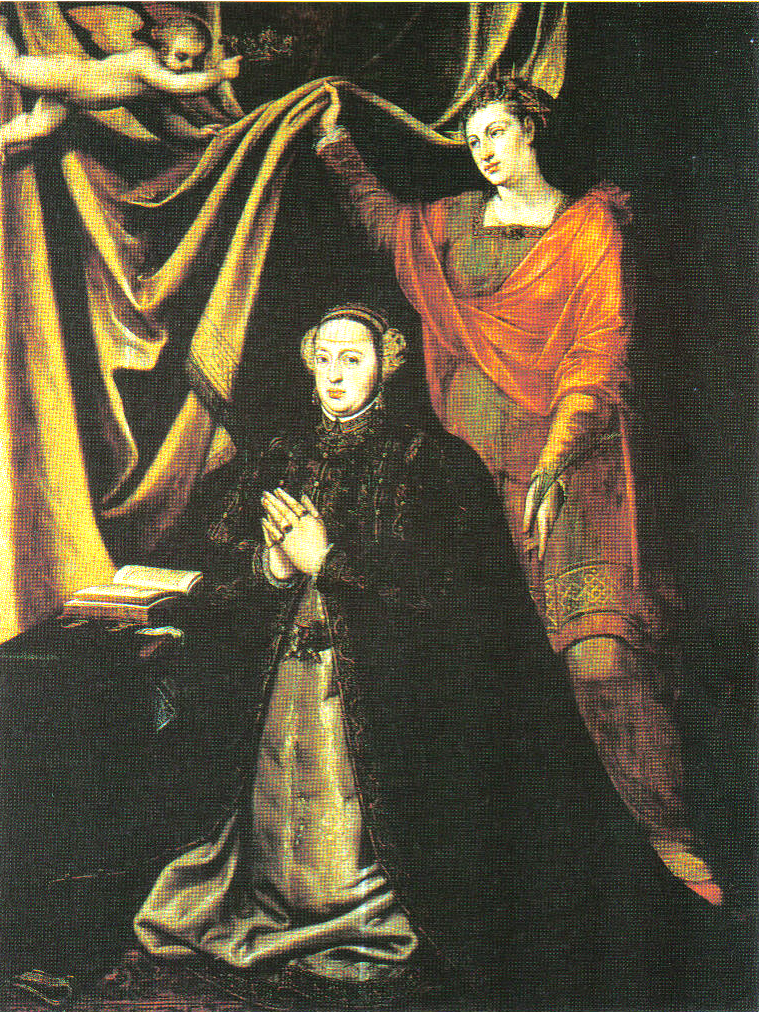
Queen Catherine and St. Catherine (Convento da Madre de Deus)

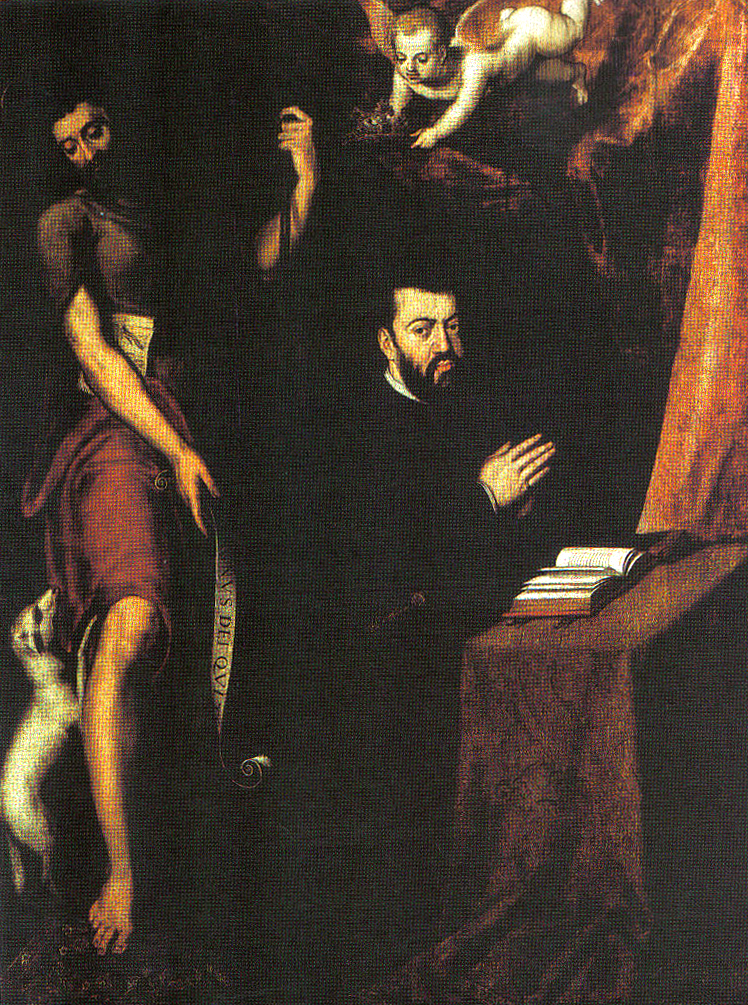
King John III and St. John the Baptist (Convento da Madre de Deus)

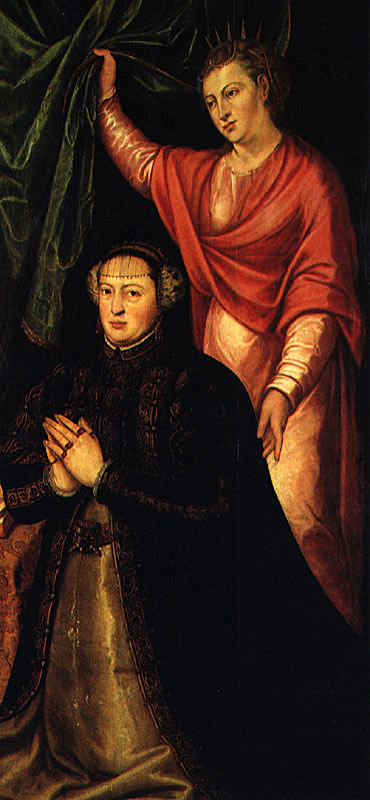
Queen Catherine and St. Catherine (Nossa Senhora da Esperança)

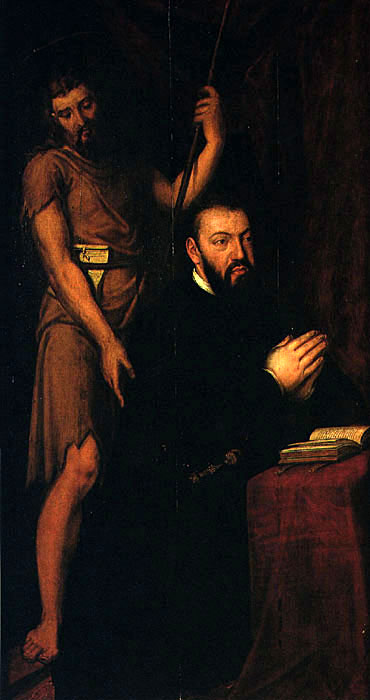
King John III and St. John the Baptist (Nossa Senhora da Esperança)
