= John III of Portugal =

King of Portugal from 1521 to 1557

John III
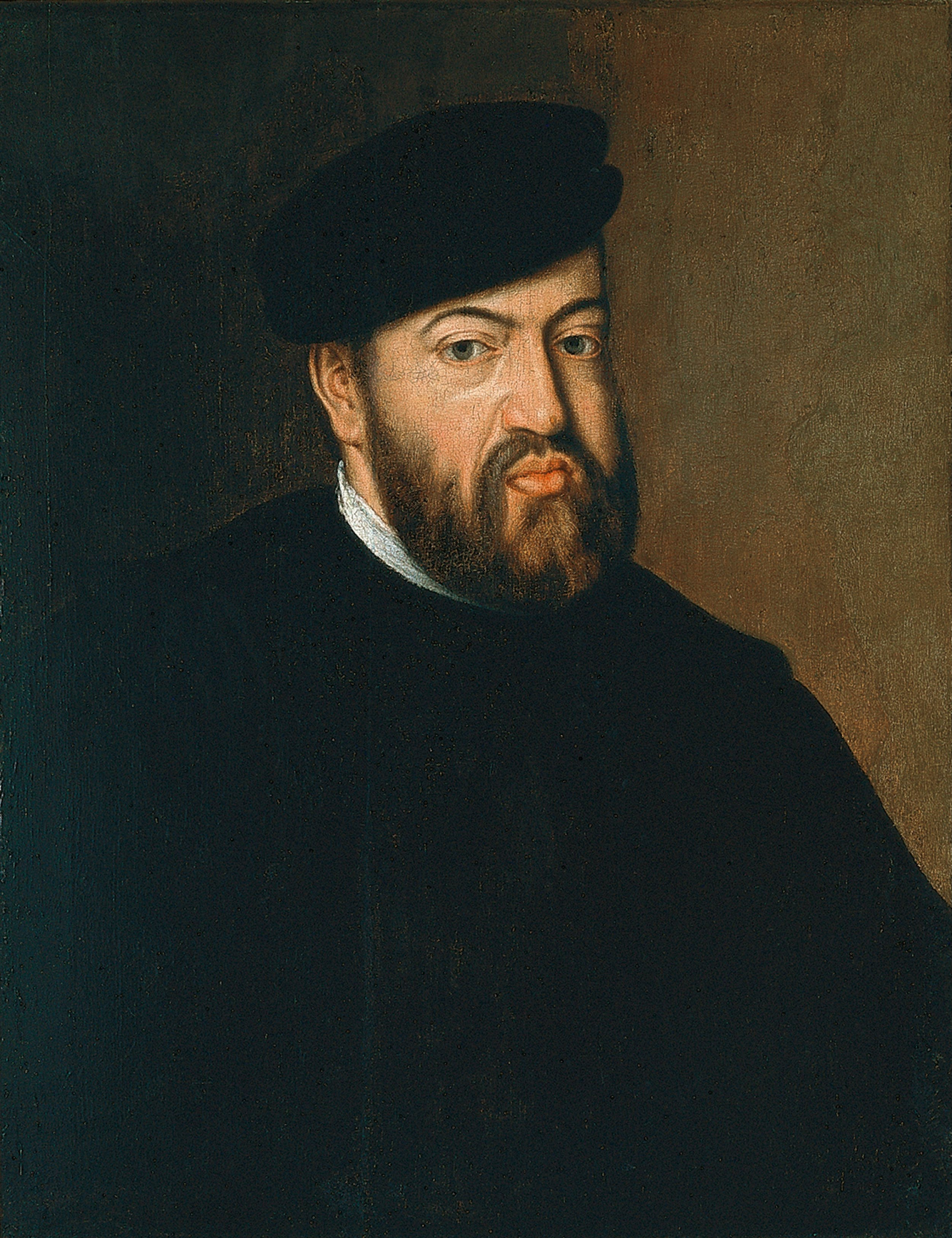
- Portrait, c. 1550–1560

King of Portugal
- Reign: 13 December 1521 – 11 June 1557
- Acclamation: 19 December 1521
- Predecessor: Manuel I
- Successor: Sebastian
- Born: 6 June 1502; Alcáçova Palace, Lisbon, Portugal
- Died: 11 June 1557 (aged 55); Ribeira Palace, Lisbon, Portugal
- Burial: Jerónimos Monastery
- Spouse: Catherine of Austria (m. 1525)
- Issue Detail: Maria Manuela, Princess of Asturias; João Manuel, Crown Prince of Portugal
- House: Aviz
- Father: Manuel I of Portugal
- Mother: Maria of Aragon
- Religion: Catholic

John III (Portuguese: João III Portuguese pronunciation: [ʒuˈɐ̃w]; 6 June 1502 – 11 June 1557), nicknamed The Pious (Portuguese: o Piedoso), was the King of Portugal and the Algarve from 1521 until he died in 1557. He was the son of King Manuel I and Maria of Aragon, the third daughter of the Catholic Monarchs of Spain, Ferdinand II of Aragon and Isabella I of Castile. John succeeded his father in 1521 at the age of nineteen.

During his rule, Portuguese possessions were extended in Asia and the Americas through the Portuguese colonization of Brazil. John III's policy of reinforcing Portugal's bases in India, such as Goa, secured Portugal's monopoly over the spice trade of cloves and nutmeg from the Maluku Islands. On the eve of his death in 1557, the Portuguese Empire had a global dimension and spanned almost 4 million square kilometres (1.5 million square miles).

During his reign, the Portuguese became the first Europeans to contact Muromachi Japan. He abandoned Muslim territories in North Africa in favor of trade with India and investments in Brazil. In Europe, he improved relations with the Baltic region and the Rhineland, hoping that this would bolster Portuguese trade.

== Early life ==
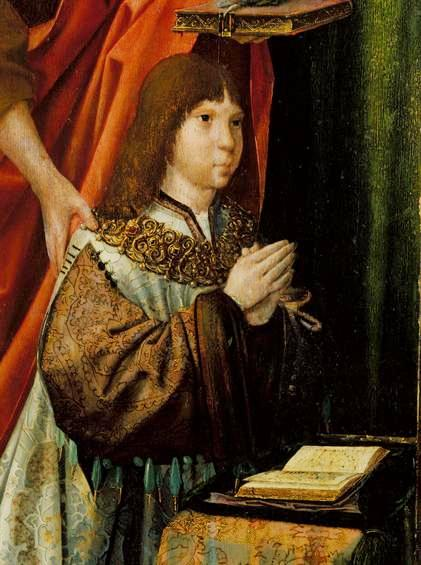
Detail of Prince John from the Triptych of the Infantes; Master of Lourinhã, 1516

John, the eldest son of King Manuel I born from his second wife Maria of Aragon, was born in Lisbon on 6 June 1502. The event was marked by the presentation of Gil Vicente's Visitation Play or the Monologue of the Cowherd (Auto da Visitação ou Monólogo do Vaqueiro) in the queen's chamber.

The young prince was sworn heir to the throne in 1503, the year his younger sister, Isabella of Portugal, Empress Consort of the Holy Roman Empire between 1527 and 1538, was born.

John was educated by notable scholars of the time, including the astrologer Tomás de Torres, Diogo de Ortiz, Bishop of Viseu, and Luís Teixeira Lobo, one of the first Portuguese Renaissance humanists, rector of the University of Siena (1476) and Professor of Law at Ferrara (1502). He studied Latin, Greek, mathematics, and cosmography.

John's chronicler António de Castilho said that, "Dom João III faced problems easily, complementing his lack of culture with a practice formation that he always showed during his reign" (Elogio d'el rei D. João de Portugal, terceiro, do nome). In 1514 he was given his own house, and a few years later began to help his father in administrative duties.

At the age of sixteen John was chosen to marry his first cousin, the 20-year-old Eleanor of Austria, the eldest daughter of Philip the Handsome of Austria-Burgundy and Queen Joanna of Castile, but instead she married his widowed father Manuel. John took deep offence at this: his chroniclers say he became melancholic and was never quite the same. Some historians also argue this was one of the main reasons that John later became fervently religious, giving him the name of the Pious (Portuguese: o Piedoso).

=== Initial reign ===
On 19 December 1521 John was crowned king in the Church of São Domingos in Lisbon, beginning a thirty-six-year reign characterized by extensive activity in internal and overseas politics, especially in relations with other major European states. John III continued the absolutist politics of his predecessors. He called the Portuguese Cortes only three times and at great intervals: 1525 in Torres Novas, 1535 in Évora and 1544 in Almeirim. During the early part of his reign, he also tried to restructure administrative and judicial life in his realm.

The marriage of John's sister Isabella of Portugal to Holy Roman Emperor Charles V, enabled the Portuguese king to forge a stronger alliance with Spain and the Holy Roman Empire. To strengthen his ties with Austria he married his maternal first cousin Catherine of Austria, younger sister of Charles V and his erstwhile fiancée Eleanor, in the town of Crato. John and Catherine had nine children who all unfortunately died at young ages. By the time of John's death, only his grandson Sebastian was alive to inherit his crown.

== Policy ==
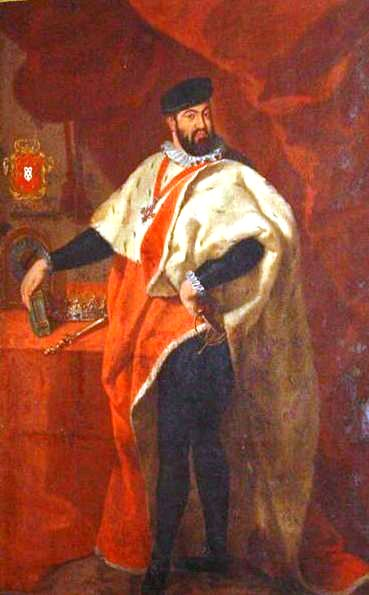
King John III portrayed as the patron of the University of Coimbra

The large and far-flung Portuguese Empire was difficult and expensive to administer and was burdened with huge external debt and trade deficits. Portugal's Indian and Far Eastern interests grew increasingly chaotic under the poor administration of ambitious governors. John III responded with new appointments that proved troubled and short-lived: in some cases, the new governors even had to fight their predecessors to take up their appointments. The resulting failures in administration brought on a gradual decline of the Portuguese trade monopoly. Considering the challenging military situation Portuguese forces faced worldwide, on 7 August 1549, John III declared every male subject between 20 and 65 years old recruitable for military service.

Among John III's many colonial governors in Asia were Vasco da Gama, Pedro Mascarenhas, Lopo Vaz de Sampaio, Nuno da Cunha, Estêvão da Gama, Martim Afonso de Sousa, João de Castro and Henrique de Meneses. Overseas, the Empire was threatened by the Ottoman Empire in both the Indian Ocean and North Africa, causing Portugal to increase spending on defense and fortifications. In the Atlantic, where Portuguese ships already had to withstand constant attacks of privateers, an attempted expansion of the French colonial empire in Brazil, France Antarctique, created yet another front. The French allied with indigenous peoples of South America against the Portuguese, and military and political interventions were used. Eventually, the French were forced out, but not until 1565.

In the first years of John III's reign, explorations in the Far East continued, and the Portuguese reached China and Japan; however, these accomplishments were offset by pressure from a strengthening Ottoman Empire under Suleiman the Magnificent, and especially in India, where attacks became more frequent. The expense of defending Indian interests was huge. To pay for it, John III abandoned several strongholds in North Africa: Safim, Azemmour, Ksar es-Seghir and Arzila.

John III achieved a crucial political victory in securing the control of the Maluku Islands, the "Spice Islands" claimed by Spain since the Magellan expedition. After almost a decade of skirmishes in Southeast Asia, he signed the Treaty of Zaragoza with Emperor Charles V on 22 April 1529. It defined the areas of Spanish and Portuguese influence in Asia and established the anti-meridian to the Treaty of Tordesillas.

=== International relations ===
The reign of John III was marked by active diplomacy. With Spain, he made alliances through marriage that ensured peace in the Iberian Peninsula for years. He married Catherine of Austria, the daughter of Philip the Handsome, the king of Castile and the Burgundian Netherlands. His sister, Isabella of Portugal, married Charles V, Holy Roman Emperor. His daughter Maria Manuela married King Philip II of Spain – and there were others. However, the intermarriage of these closely related royal families may have contributed to the poor health of John's children and future King Sebastian of Portugal.

John III remained neutral during the war between France and Spain but stood firm in fighting the attacks of French privateers.

He strengthened relations with the Papal States by establishing the Portuguese Inquisition in 1536, as well as the adhesion of the Portuguese clergy to the Counter-Reformation. This relationship with the Catholic Church made it possible for John to name whoever he desired for important religious positions in Portugal: his brothers Henry and Afonso were made cardinals and his biological son, Duartem was made archbishop of Braga.

Commercial relations were intensified with England, the countries of the Baltic region, and Flanders during John III's reign. Meanwhile, on the opposite side of the world, Portugal was the first European nation to contact Japan. In China, Macau was offered to the Portuguese, and soon, Portugal controlled significant trade routes in the area. In South Asia, the Portuguese continued their hostile stance against Muslim rivals and insurgent Indian leaders.

== Culture ==
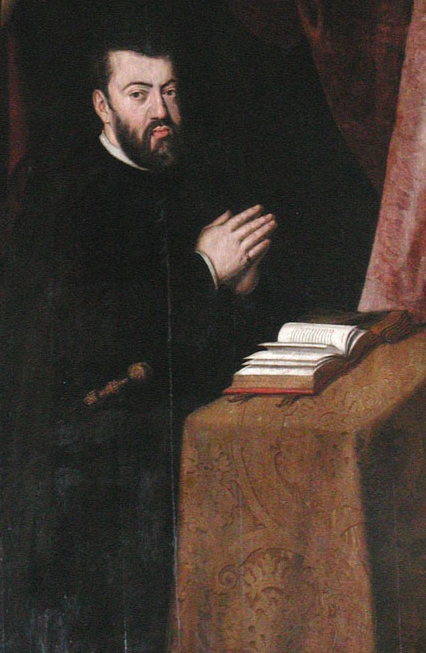
Portrait of the King D. João III of Portugal; Cristóvão Lopes, 1552

John III's support for the humanist cause was significant. He patronized various writers, including Gil Vicente, Garcia de Resende, Sá de Miranda, Bernardim Ribeiro, Fernão Mendes Pinto, João de Barros and Luís de Camões. He also supported the mathematician Pedro Nunes and the physician Garcia de Orta. Through his links to Portuguese humanists such as Luís Teixeira Lobo, Erasmus dedicated his Chrysostomi Lucubrationes to John III of Portugal in 1527. French mathematician Jean Fernel and Spanish academic Juan Luis Vives also dedicated works to the king.

John awarded many scholarships to universities abroad, mainly in the University of Paris, where fifty Portuguese students were sent to the Collège Sainte-Barbe headed by Diogo de Gouveia. He definitively transferred the Portuguese university from Lisbon to Coimbra in 1537.

In 1547 John established in Coimbra a College of Arts and Humanities (Liberal arts) and invited André de Gouveia, principal of the College of Guienne in Bordeaux, to head the college and organize faculty. André de Gouveia assembled a group of Scottish, French, and Portuguese scholars who had been educated in France. Those included George Buchanan, Diogo de Teive, Jerónimo Osório, Nicolas de Grouchy, Guillaume Guérante and Élie Vinet, who were decisive for the dissemination of the contemporary research of Pedro Nunes. However, rivalry between the orthodox views of the "Parisians" group headed by Diogo de Gouveia and the more secular views of the "Bordeaux" school headed by his nephew André de Gouveia led to accusations of heterodoxy and Protestant sympathies, resulting in all foreign professors leaving by 1551. The Society of Jesus took over administration of the college in 1555.

Another noteworthy aspect of John III's rule was the support he gave to missionaries in the New World, Asia and Africa. In 1540, after successive appeals to Pope Paul III asking for missionaries for the Portuguese East Indies under the "Padroado" agreement, John III appointed Francis Xavier to take charge as Apostolic Nuncio. He had been enthusiastically endorsed by Diogo de Gouveia, his teacher at the Collège Sainte-Barbe, and advised the king to draw the youngsters of the newly formed Society of Jesus. The Jesuits were particularly important for mediating Portuguese relations with native peoples.

== Inquisition ==
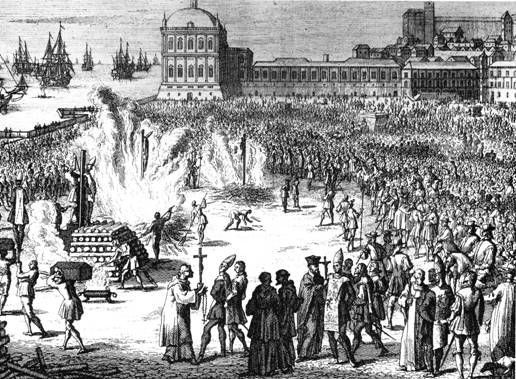
An auto-da-fé of the Portuguese Inquisition, in the Terreiro do Paço in front of Ribeira Palace in Lisbon.

John III was persuaded to establish the Inquisition in Portugal by pressure from neighboring Castile and reports that New Christians had failed to properly renounce Judaism. Following ten years of negotiations with Rome, a Portuguese Inquisition received papal dispensation in 1536. The first Grand Inquisitor was Cardinal Henry, the king's brother (who would later himself become king).

The activities of the Inquisition extended from book censorship, repression and trial for divination, witchcraft and bigamy, as well as the prosecution of sexual crimes, especially sodomy. Because Protestants and Jews did not have a significant presence in Portugal, the Inquisition instead targeted New Christians.

The Inquisition in Portugal gradually became a remarkably powerful entity with its own extensive bureaucracy. There were inquisitorial courts in Lisbon, Coimbra, Évora and Goa that each featured a central office and employed dozens of officials. The Inquisition's procedures were severe and irregular, accepting any denunciation as evidence, denying prisoners the right to choose their defenders, and allowing no appeal outside the Inquisition. Punishments ranged from fines and imprisonment to property confiscation and banishment, with executions for heresy carried out by Crown justice. Between 1543 and 1684, at least 1,379 people were burned at the stake, and a minimum of 19,247 were condemned, with many dying in prison without trial.

== Imperial management ==
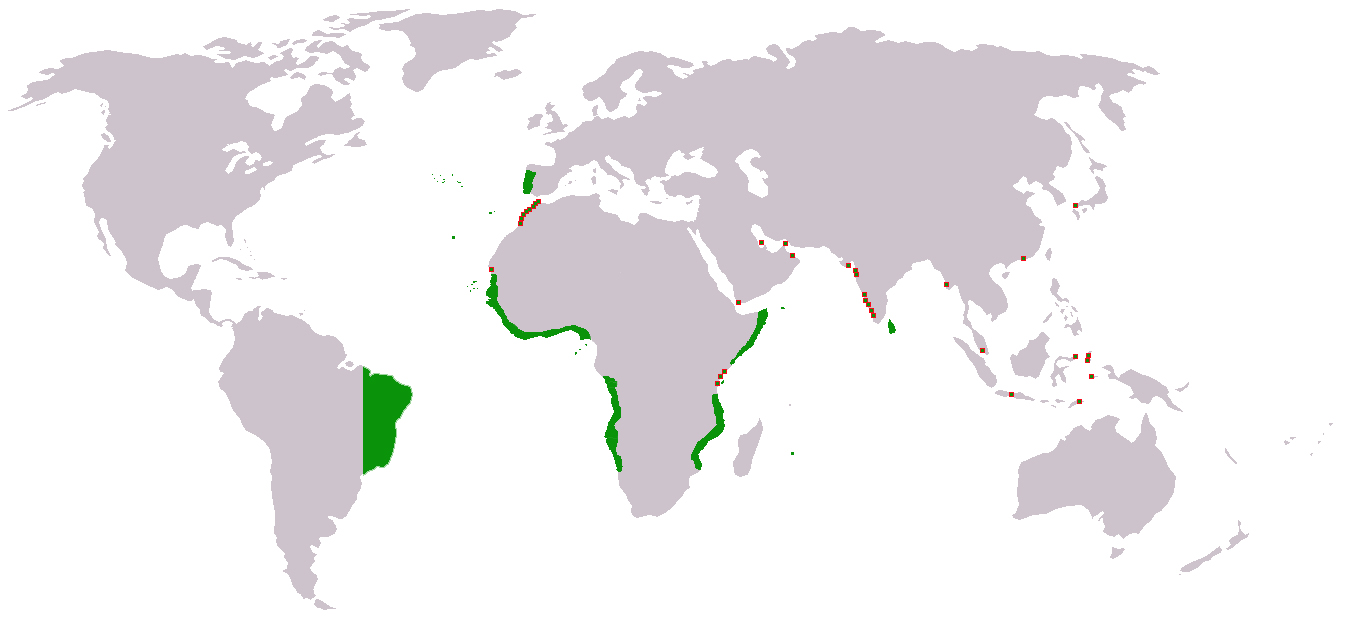
Map of Portugal and its colonial empire alongside its military and trade outposts, at the height of the reign of King John III of Portugal.

=== Luso-African relations ===
In John III's time, trade between the Portuguese and Africans was extremely intense in feitorias such Arguim, Mina, Mombasa, Sofala or Mozambique. Under John III, several expeditions started in coastal Africa and advanced to the interior of the continent. These expeditions were formed by groups of navigators, merchants, adventurers and missionaries. Missions in Africa were established by the College of Arts of Coimbra. The objective was to increase the king's dominion, develop peaceful relations and to Christianize the indigenous peoples. Relations with local rulers were often complicated by trade in slaves, as shown by John's correspondence with them.

John III refused to abandon all of the Portuguese North African strongholds, but he had to make choices based on the economic or strategic value of each possession. John III decided to leave Safim and Azamor in 1541, followed by Arzila and Alcácer Ceguer in 1549. The fortresses of Ceuta, Tangiers and Mazagan were strengthened "to face the new military techniques, imposed by the generalization of heavy artillery, combined with light fire weapons and blades".

John III's court jester was João de Sá Panasco, a black African, who was eventually admitted to the prestigious Order of Saint James based on his service in the Conquest of Tunis (1535).

=== Luso-Asian relations ===
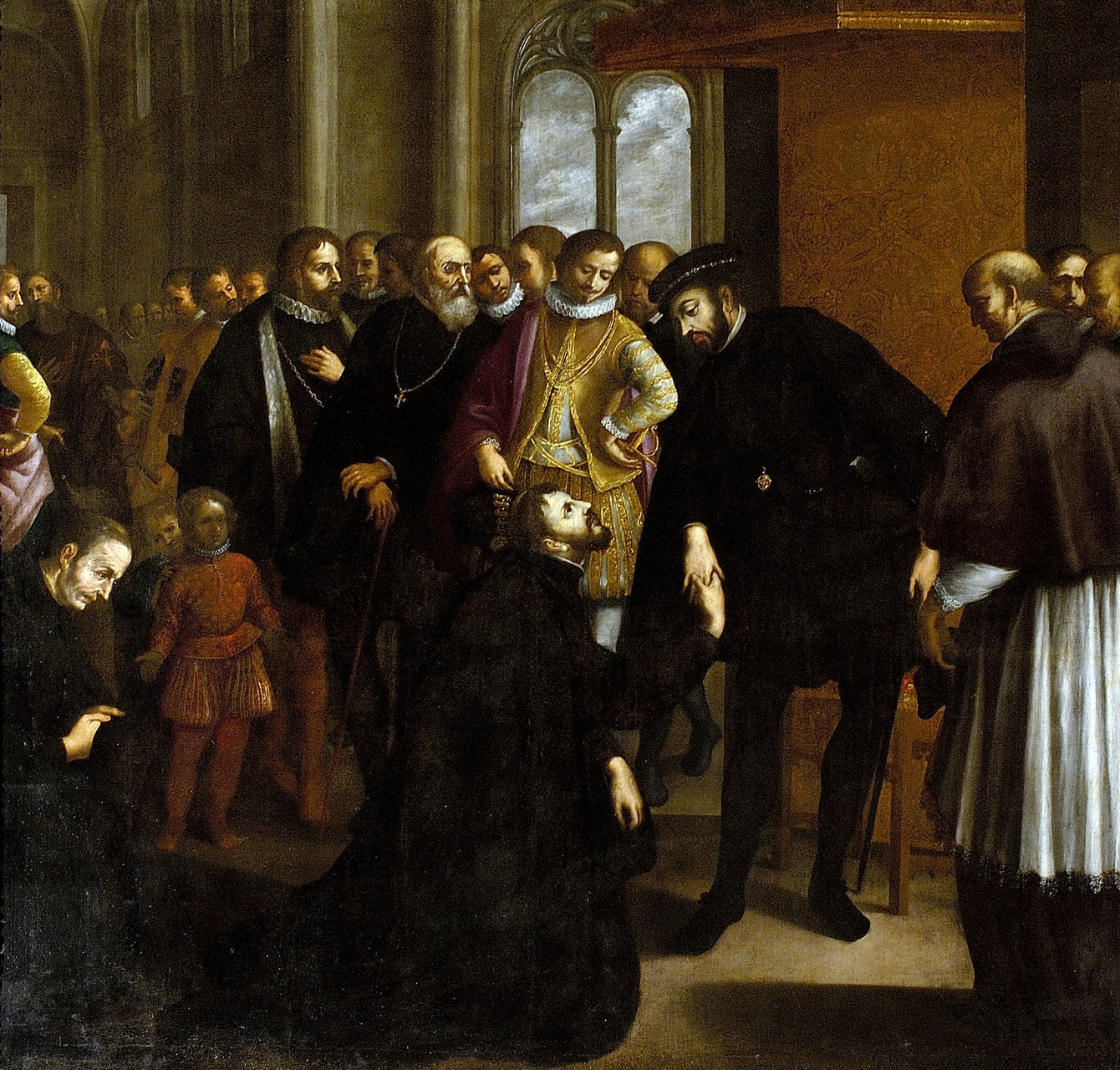
Francis Xavier asking King John III for the Evangelization of Asia; Avelar Rebelo, 1635.

Before the reign of John III, the Portuguese had already reached Siam (1511), the Maluku Islands (1512), the Chinese littoral (1513), Canton (1517) and Timor (1515). During John's rule the Portuguese reached Japan, and at the end of John's reign Macau was offered to Portugal by China. From India, John III imported an amazing variety of spices, herbs, minerals, and fabrics; from Malacca, exotic woods and spice; from Bengala, fabrics and exotic foodstuffs; from Alexandria and Cairo, exotic woods, metals, minerals, fabrics, and boullion; and from China, musk, rhubarb and silk in exchange for gromwells, pearls, horses from Arabia and Persia, non-worked silk, silk embroidery threads, fruits of the date palm, raisins, salt, sulphur and many other goods.

As Muslims and other peoples constantly attacked Portuguese fleets in India, and because it was so far away from mainland Portugal, it was extremely difficult for John III to secure Portuguese dominion in this area. A viceroy (or Governor-General with extensive powers) was nominated, but it was not enough to defend the Portuguese possessions in India. The Portuguese started by creating feitorias – commercial strongholds in Cochin, Cannanore, Coulão, Cranganore and Tanor – with the initial objective of establishing just a commercial dominion in the region.

The hostility of many Indian kingdoms and alliances between sultans and zamorins with the intent of expelling the Portuguese made it necessary for the Europeans to establish a sovereign state. Portugal thus militarily occupied some key cities on the Indian coast and Goa became the headquarters of the Portuguese Empire in the East as of 1512. Goa became a starting point for the introduction of European cultural and religious values in India, and churches, schools and hospitals were built. Goa remained an overseas possession of Portugal until India reclaimed it in 1961.

The Portuguese arrived in Japan in 1543. Japan had been known in Portugal since the time of Marco Polo, who called it "Cipango". Whether Portuguese nationals were the first Europeans to arrive in Japan is debated. Some say the first Portuguese arrival was the writer Fernão Mendes Pinto, while others say it was the navigators António Peixoto, António Mota, and Francisco Zeimoto.

Portuguese traders started negotiating with Japan as early as of 1550 and established a base there in Nagasaki. By then, trade with Japan was a Portuguese monopoly under the rule of a captain. Because the Portuguese established themselves in Macau, Chinese commercial relations and the silver trade with Japan were improved under John III's rule.

After the voyage of Ferdinand Magellan, the Crown of Castile claimed the recently discovered Maluku Islands. In 1524, a conference of experts (cartographers, cosmographers, pilots, etc.) was held to solve the dispute caused by the difficulty of determining the meridian agreed to in the Treaty of Tordesillas. The Portuguese delegation sent by John III included names such as António de Azevedo Coutinho, Diogo Lopes de Sequeira, Lopo Homem and Simão Fernandes. The dispute was settled in 1529 by the Treaty of Zaragoza, signed by John III and Charles I of Spain. The Portuguese paid 350,000 gold ducados to Spain and secured their presence in the islands, which was not actually necessary, since Portugal was actually entitled to the islands according to the Treaty of Tordesillas.

In 1553, Leonel de Sousa obtained authorization for the Portuguese to establish themselves in Canton and Macau. Macau was later offered to John III as a reward for Portuguese assistance against maritime piracy in the period between 1557 and 1564.

=== Portuguese America ===
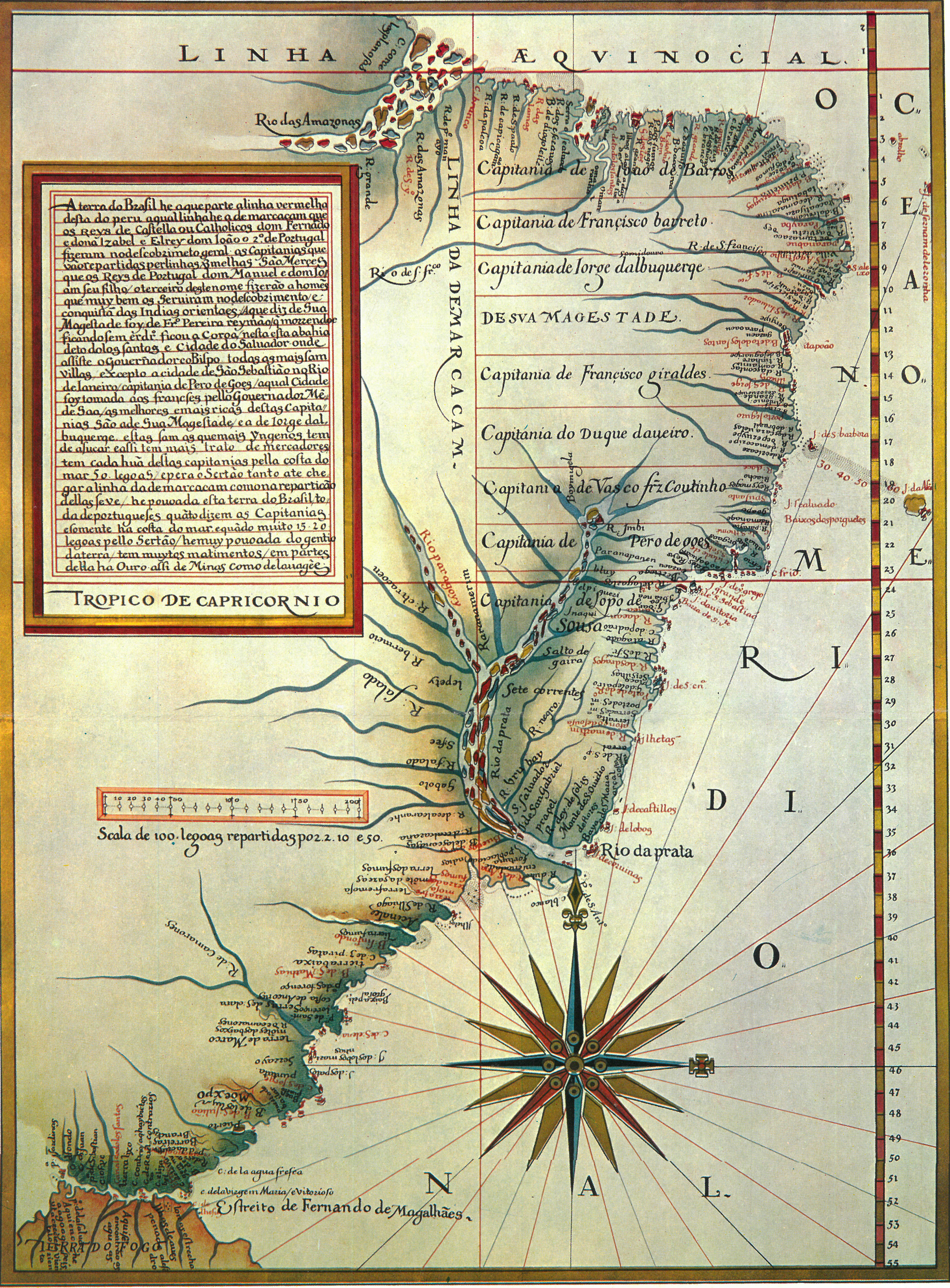
Captaincies of the Governorate General of Brazil

During the reign of King John III the Portuguese Empire established itself in South America with the foundation of the twelve Captaincy Colonies of Brazil (from 1534 onwards). Each with its own donatary captain, the twelve colonies worked independently. In 1549, John III established the Governorate General of Brazil, and the twelve captaincy colonies became subordinate to it. The first Governor-General appointed by John III, Tomé de Sousa, founded the city of Salvador, Bahia (São Salvador da Bahia de Todos os Santos) in 1549. For his role in the colonization of South America, John III has been referred to as The Colonizer (Portuguese: "o Colonizador").

Immediately following the discovery of Brazil in 1500, the Portuguese imported brazilwood, Indian slaves and exotic birds from there. Brazilian wood was a very appreciated product in Europe because it could be used to produce a type of red dye. During John III's rule, after the initial colonization, Portuguese explorers intensified the search for brazilwood and began the cultivation of sugarcane, which was well suited to the climate of Brazil and especially around Recife and Bahia.

In the final years of John's reign Portugal's colony of Brazil was just beginning its rapid development as a producer of sugar that compensated for the gradual decline of revenues from Asia, a development that would continue during the reign of his grandson and successor, Sebastian (1557–1578). Since Brazil lacked a large native population and the ones who lived there weren't adapted to the strenuous work required in the plantation fields, the Portuguese colonists began importing African slaves to strengthen the workforce present in the territory. The first slaves, from the region of Guinea, arrived in Brazil in 1539. Most of them worked in the sugarcane fields or served as house servants.

== Death and dynastic issue ==
From 1539, the heir to the throne was João Manuel, Prince of Portugal, who married Joanna of Austria, Princess of Portugal, a daughter of Charles V. Prince John, the sole son of John III to survive childhood, was sickly and died of juvenile diabetes at the young age of 16, just eighteen days before his wife gave birth to Prince Sebastian on 20 January 1554.

Name	Birth	Death	Notes
By Catherine of Austria (married 10 February 1525)
Prince Afonso	24 February 1526	12 April 1526	Prince of Portugal (1526), died in infancy.
Princess Maria Manuela	15 October 1527	12 July 1545	Princess of Portugal (1527–1531). Princess consort of Asturias by marriage to King Philip II of Spain, then Prince of Asturias. She had one deformed child, Prince Carlos, and she died a few days after his birth.
Infanta Isabel	28 April 1529	22 May 1530	Died in early childhood.
Infanta Beatriz (Beatrice)	15 February 1530	16 March 1530	Died in infancy.
Prince Manuel	1 November 1531	14 April 1537	Prince of Portugal (1531–1537). Declared heir in 1531 but died in childhood.
Prince Filipe (Philip)	25 March 1533	29 April 1539	Prince of Portugal (1537–1539). Declared heir in 1537 but died in childhood.
Infante Dinis (Denis)	26 April 1535	1 January 1537	Died in early childhood.
Prince João Manuel	3 June 1537	2 January 1554	Prince of Portugal (1537–1554). Declared heir in 1539 but died in adolescence. Married Joanna of Austria. Their son became King Sebastian I.
Infante António (Anthony)	9 March 1539	20 January 1540	Died in infancy.
By Isabel Moniz
Duarte, Archbishop of Braga	1529	11 November 1543	Natural son, died in adolescence.

When John III died of apoplexy in 1557, his only heir was his three-year-old grandson, Sebastian. John III's body rests in the Monastery of Jerónimos in Lisbon.

== Style ==
Like his predecessors John III used the style "El-rei" (the king) followed by "Dom" (abbreviated to D.), a mark of high esteem for a distinguished Christian nobleman.

The official style was the same used by his father Manuel I: "Dom João, by the grace of God, King of Portugal, of the Algarves, of either side of the sea in Africa, Lord of Guinea, & of the Conquest, Navigation, & Commerce of Ethiopia, Arabia, Persia, & India" (Dom João, por graça de Deus, Rei de Portugal, e dos Algarves, d'aquém e d'além mar em África, Senhor da Guiné, e da Conquista, Navegação, & Comércio da Etiópia, Arábia, Pérsia, & Índia). This style would only change in the 19th century when Brazil became a Vice-Kingdom.

== Ancestry ==
Ancestors of John III of Portugal

8. Edward I of Portugal
4. Ferdinand, Duke of Viseu
9. Eleanor of Aragon
2. Manuel I of Portugal
10. John, Constable of Portugal
5. Beatrice of Portugal
11. Isabel of Barcelos
1. John III of Portugal
12. John II of Aragon
6. Ferdinand II of Aragon
13. Juana Enríquez
3. Maria of Aragon
14. John II of Castile
7. Isabella I of Castile
15. Isabella of Portugal

== In popular culture ==
John III of Portugal figures in José Saramago's 2008 novel The Elephant's Journey.

John III features in Laurent Binet's 2021 novel Civilizations.

John III was mentioned in the historical Thai film The Legend of Suriyothai in 2001, but his role was cut when it was released.

John III (referred to as João III) leads the Portuguese civilization in the 2016 4X video game Civilization VI, being released in the Portugal Pack on 25 March 2021, as part of the "New Frontier Pass" DLC. His ability and civilization focuses on maritime trade.

== See also ==
- Descendants of Manuel I of Portugal

== Notes ==
John III of Portugal House of Aviz Cadet branch of the House of Burgundy Born: 6 June 1502 Died: 11 June 1557
Regnal titles
Preceded by Manuel I	King of Portugal; 1521–1557	Succeeded by Sebastian
Portuguese royalty
Vacant Title last held by Miguel da Paz	Prince of Portugal; 1502–1521	Vacant Title next held by Afonso
