= Catherine of Austria, Queen of Portugal =

Queen of Portugal from 1525 to 1557

Catherine of Austria
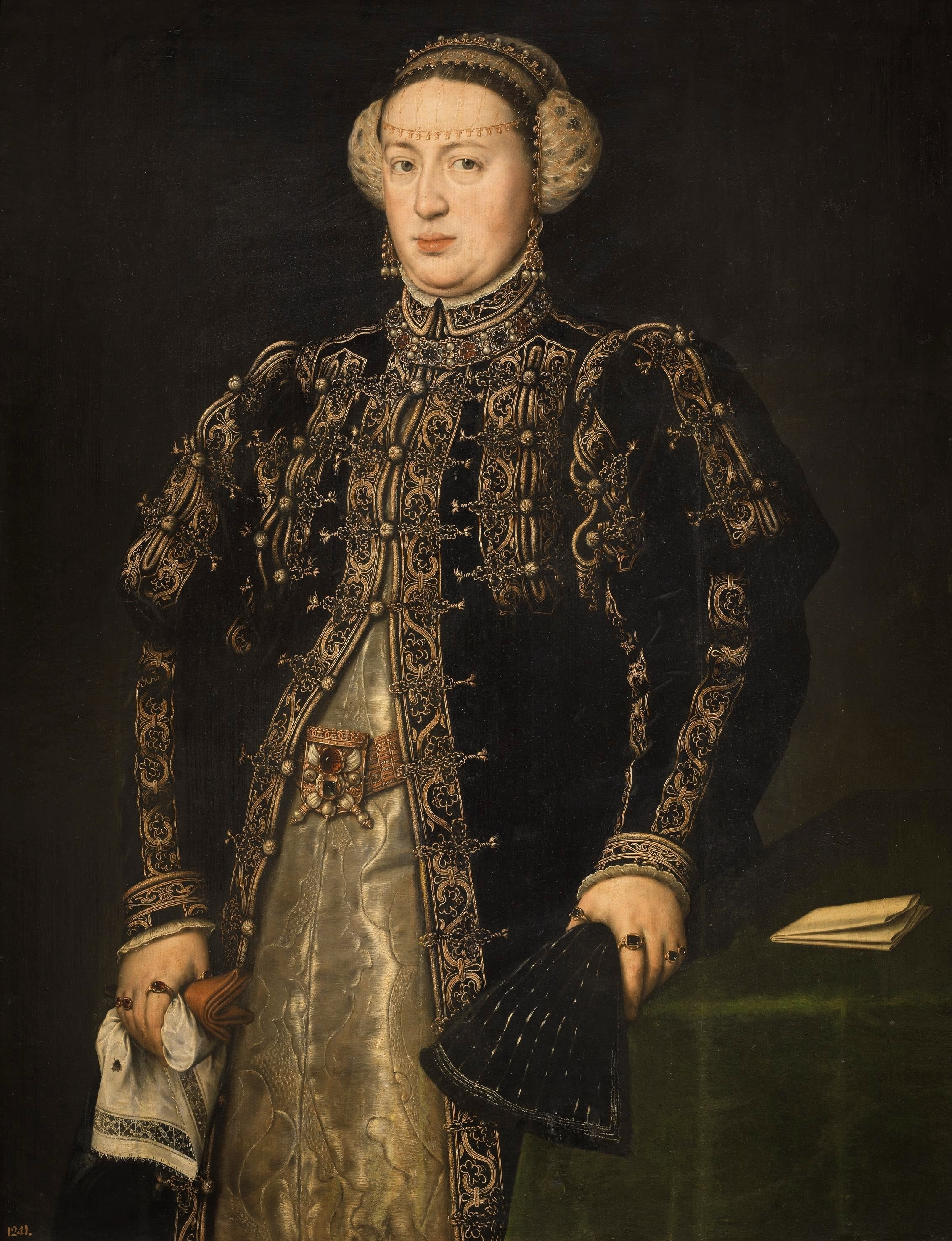
- Portrait by Anthonis Mor, 1552

Queen consort of Portugal
- Tenure: 10 February 1525 – 11 June 1557

Queen regent of Portugal
- Regency: 11 June 1557 – 12 February 1558
- Monarch: Sebastian
- Born: 14 January 1507; Torquemada, Crown of Castile
- Died: 12 February 1578 (aged 71); Ribeira Palace, Lisbon, Portugal
- Burial: Jerónimos Monastery
- Spouse: John III of Portugal (m. 1525; died 1557)
- Issue Detail: Afonso, Prince of Portugal; Maria Manuela, Princess of Portugal; Manuel, Prince of Portugal; Philip, Prince of Portugal; João Manuel, Prince of Portugal
- House: Habsburg
- Father: Philip the Handsome
- Mother: Joanna of Castile

Catherine of Austria or Catherine of Spain (Portuguese: Catarina; 14 January 1507 – 12 February 1578) was a Queen of Portugal as the wife of King John III, and a regent during the minority of her grandson, King Sebastian, from 1557 until 1562.

== Early life ==
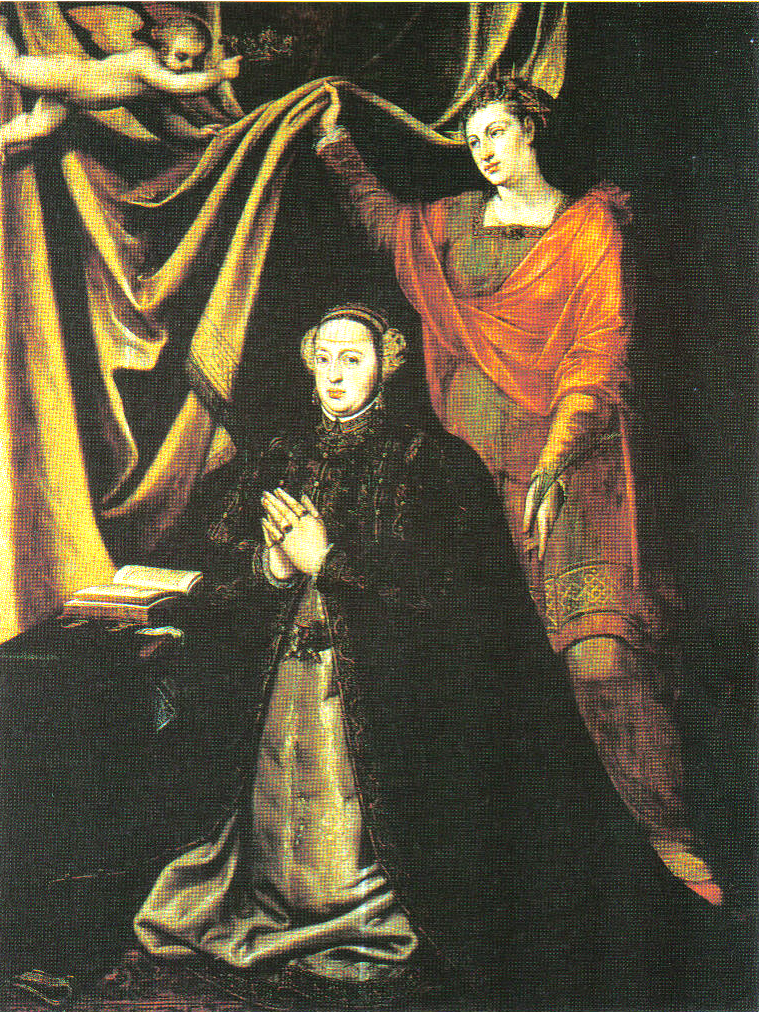
Altarpiece by Cristóvão Lopes in the Convent of Madre de Deus in Lisbon depicting Catherine of Austria with her namesake, St. Catherine of Alexandria. Currently on display in the National Museum of Ancient Art in Lisbon.

An Infanta of Castile and Archduchess of Austria, Catherine was the posthumous daughter of King Philip I and Queen Joanna of Castile. Catherine was born in Torquemada and named in honor of her maternal aunt, Catherine of Aragon. As the queen had no midwife at the time, she was assisted during childbirth by her lady-in-waiting, María de Ulloa.

All of her five older siblings, except Ferdinand, were born in the Habsburg Netherlands and had been put into the care of their aunt Margaret of Austria, but Joanna kept young Catherine by her side. Catherine stayed with her mother during her imprisonment at Tordesillas during her grandfather Ferdinand II of Aragon's time as regent and her elder brother Charles's reign as co-king. When the time came for her to marry, Catherine was released from the custody her mother was to endure until her death.

== Queen ==
On 10 February 1525, at the age of 18, Catherine married her first cousin, King John III of Portugal. The marriage was secured by her brother, Emperor Charles V, as a means for the Emperor to secure political stability in Iberia. They had nine children together, though only two survived past early childhood.

Catherine was very concerned about the education of her family, accumulating a substantial library and establishing a kind of salon in the court. She brought a number of female scholars into her household, including the humanists Joana Vaz and Públia Hortênsia de Castro and the poet Luisa Sigea de Velasco. Vaz was responsible for tutoring Catherine's only surviving daughter, Princess Maria, as well as Catherine's niece, also called Maria, and a scholar in her own right.

After the death of her husband in 1557, Catherine was challenged by her daughter-in-law and niece Joanna of Austria, over the role of regent for her grandchild, the infant King Sebastian. Mediation by Charles V resolved the issue in favor of his sister Catherine over his daughter Joan, who was needed in Spain in the absence of Philip II.

Catherine then served as the regent of Portugal from 1557 until 1562. In 1562, she turned over the regency to Henry of Portugal.

== Issue ==
Name	Birth	Death	Notes
With John III, King of Portugal (married 10 February 1525)
Prince Afonso	24 February 1526	12 April 1526	Prince of Portugal (1526), died in infancy.
Princess Maria Manuela	15 October 1527	12 July 1545	Princess of Portugal (1527–1531). First wife of King Philip II of Spain. She had one child, Don Carlos, and died four days after his birth.
Infanta Isabel	28 April 1529	22 May 1530	Died in infancy.
Infanta Beatriz	15 February 1530	16 March 1530	Died in infancy.
Prince Manuel	1 November 1531	14 April 1537	Prince of Portugal (1531–1537). Declared heir in 1531 but died in childhood.
Prince Philip	25 March 1533	29 April 1539	Prince of Portugal (1537–1539). Declared heir in 1537 but died in childhood.
Infante Denis	6 April 1535	1 January 1537	Died in childhood.
Prince João Manuel	3 June 1537	2 January 1554	Prince of Portugal (1539–1554). Declared heir in 1539 but died in adolescence. Married Joanna of Spain. Their son Sebastian became king.
Infante Antonio	9 March 1539	20 January 1540	Died in infancy.

Catherine has no descendants today, as both of her grandchildren died childless. Her line of descent became extinct within six months of her death, as the only descendant of hers that survived her, King Sebastian of Portugal, died in August 1578.

== Collector ==
Catherine had one of the earliest and finest Chinese porcelain collections in Europe due to her position as Queen of Portugal. "She acquired quantities of porcelain and exotica from Asia, which arrived regularly in Lisbon for the decoration of the Lisbon royal palace as well as for her personal use, and which served as emblems of her power. Her collection became the first kunstkammer on the Iberian Peninsula." She was following a tradition established earlier by the Portuguese King Manuel I of Portugal who had purchased porcelain for his wife, Maria of Castile (1482–1517), who was Catherine's aunt. Between 1511 and 1514, the Treasurer of the Spices in Lisbon "registered a total of 692 pieces of porcelain and other exotic goods" bought on his behalf for Maria of Castile, who was then King Manuel's second wife. Amongst other "exotica" in Catherine's collection were fossilized sharks' teeth, a snake's head encased in gold, heart-shaped jasper stones to stop bleeding, a coral branch used as a protector against evil spirits, bezoar stones, a unicorn's horn (a narwhal tusk) and piles of loose gems and stones such as rubies, emeralds, and diamonds.

== In popular culture ==
Catherine of Austria figures in José Saramago's 2008 novel The Elephant's Journey. She also figures in Laurent Binet's 2019 novel Civilizations.

She was also featured in Kei Ohkubo's manga Arte, under the alias Irene at first; later, she revealed herself as Catalina, daughter to Juana of Castile. The timing was unspecified, but this fictitious arrival of Catalina at Florence could be some time between her release from custody and before her marriage; during her inner monologue, her brother, who had ordered a cardinal that was accommodating Catalina's trip to watch over her movements, was shown wearing a crown.

== Ancestry ==
Ancestors of Catherine of Austria

8. Frederick III, Holy Roman Emperor
4. Maximilian I, Holy Roman Emperor
9. Eleanor of Portugal
2. Philip I of Castile
10. Charles I, Duke of Burgundy
5. Mary, Duchess of Burgundy
11. Isabella of Bourbon
1. Catherine of Austria
12. John II of Aragon
6. Ferdinand II of Aragon
13. Juana Enriquez
3. Joanna of Castile
14. John II of Castile
7. Isabella I of Castile
15. Isabella of Portugal

== Sources ==
Preceded by Eleanor of Austria	Queen consort of Portugal; 10 February 1525 – 11 June 1557	Succeeded by Anna of Austria
Preceded by Infante Peter in 1448	Regent of Portugal and the Algarves; 11 June 1557 – 23 December 1562	Succeeded by Infante Henry
