= Joanna of Castile =

Queen of Castile (1504–1555) and Aragon (1516–1555)

Joanna
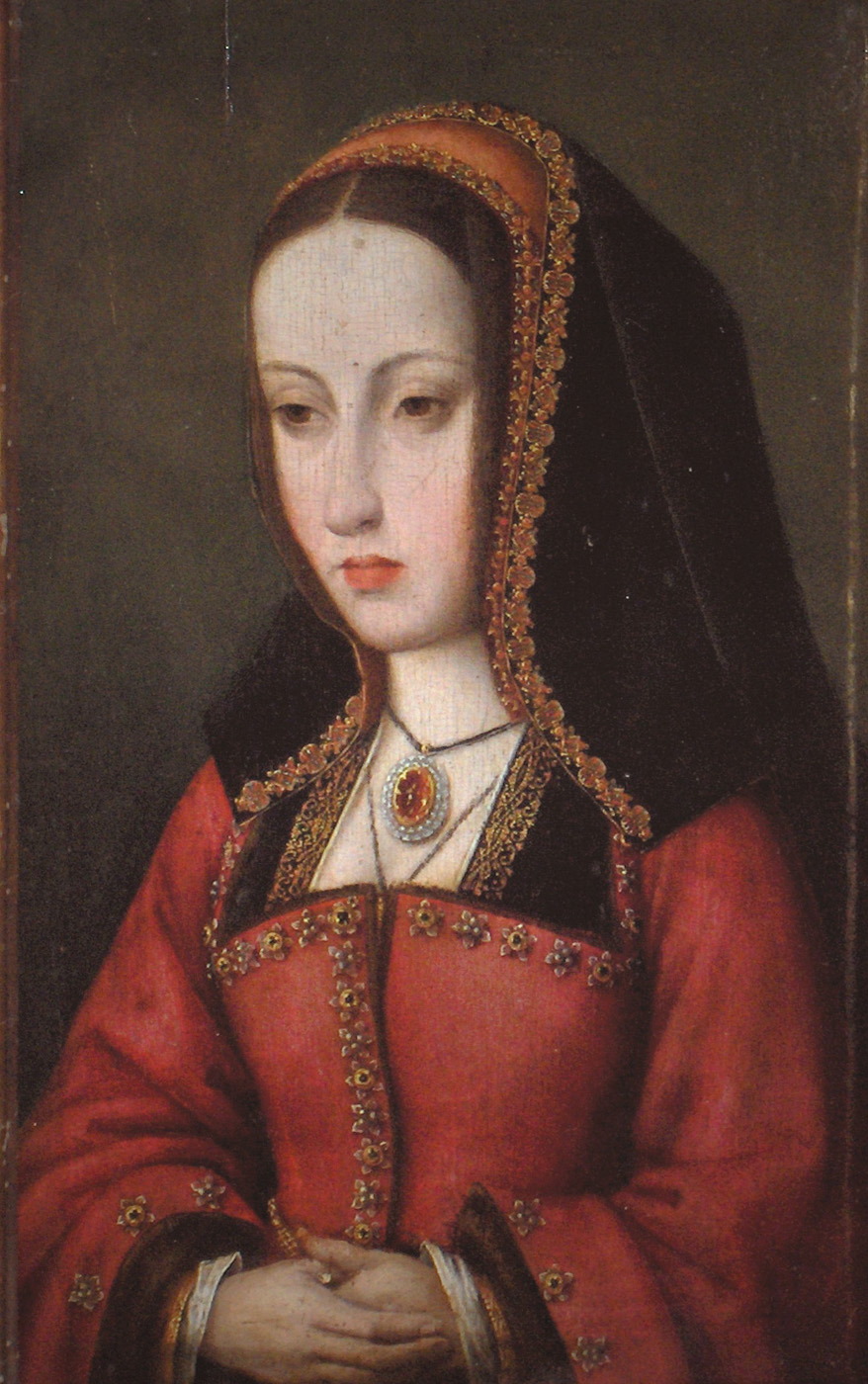
- Portrait by the Master of Affligem, c. 1500

Queen of Castile and León
- Reign: 26 November 1504 – 12 April 1555
- Predecessors: Isabella I and Ferdinand V
- Successor: Charles I
- Co-monarchs: Philip I (1506); Charles I (1516–1555)
- Regents: See: Ferdinand II of Aragon (1504–1506; 1507–1516) Francisco Jiménez de Cisneros (1506; 1516–1517)

Queen of Aragon, Navarre, Sicily, Naples, Sardinia, and Countess of Barcelona
- Reign: 23 January 1516 – 12 April 1555
- Predecessor: Ferdinand II
- Successor: Charles I
- Co-monarch: Charles I
- Regents: See: Alonso de Aragón and Germaine of Foix (1516)
- Born: 6 November 1479; Toledo, Crown of Castile
- Died: 12 April 1555 (aged 75); Tordesillas, Crown of Castile
- Burial: Royal Chapel of Granada, Granada, Castile
- Spouse: Philip the Handsome (m. 1496; died 1506)
- Issue: Eleanor, Queen of Portugal and France; Charles V, Holy Roman Emperor; Isabella, Queen of Denmark, Norway and Sweden; Ferdinand I, Holy Roman Emperor; Mary, Queen of Hungary; Catherine, Queen of Portugal
- House: Trastámara (by birth); Habsburg (by marriage)
- Father: Ferdinand II of Aragon
- Mother: Isabella I of Castile
- Religion: Catholic Church

Joanna or Joan (also known as Joanna the Mad or Joan the Mad; Spanish: Juana la Loca; 6 November 1479 – 12 April 1555) was Queen of Castile from 1504 and Queen of Aragon from 1516 to her death in 1555. She was the daughter of Queen Isabella I of Castile and King Ferdinand II of Aragon. Joanna was married by arrangement to the Austrian archduke Philip the Handsome on 20 October 1496. Following the deaths of her elder brother John, elder sister Isabella, and nephew Miguel between 1497 and 1500, Joanna became the heir presumptive to the crowns of Castile and Aragon. When her mother died in 1504, she became queen of Castile. Her father proclaimed himself governor and administrator of Castile.

In 1506, Joanna's husband Philip became King of Castile jure uxoris as Philip I, initiating the rule of the Habsburgs in the Spanish kingdoms. Philip died that same year. Despite being the ruling Queen of Castile, Joanna had little effect on national policy during her reign as she was declared insane and confined in the Royal Palace in Tordesillas under the orders of her father, who ruled as regent until his death in 1516, when she inherited his kingdom as well. Her son Charles I became king, and during his reign, Joanna was nominally co-monarch but remained confined until her death. She died aged 75 in 1555. Historians have debated the authenticity of her alleged madness, and whether or not it was used to discredit her.

== Early life ==
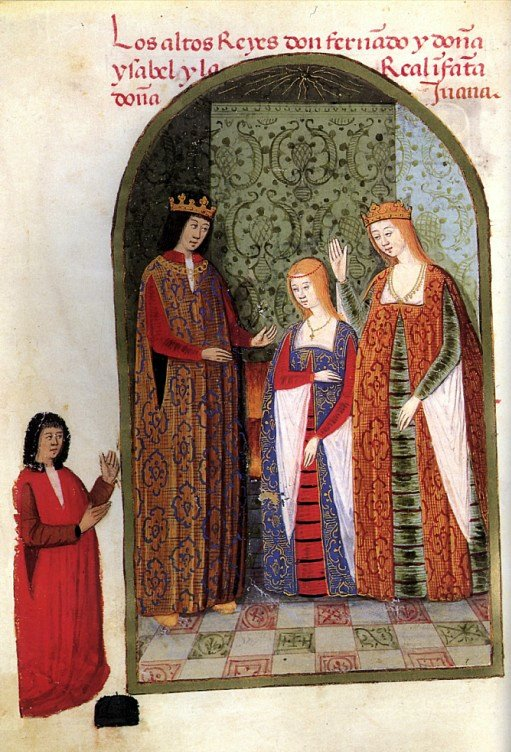
Joanna with her parents, Isabella and Ferdinand; "Rimado de la conquista de Granada", by Pedro Marcuello, c. 1482

Joanna was born on 6 November 1479 in the city of Toledo in the Kingdom of Castile. She was the fourth but third surviving child and the second daughter of Isabella I of Castile and Ferdinand II of Aragon, both members of the House of Trastámara.

She had a fair complexion and brown eyes, and her hair colour was between strawberry-blonde and auburn, like her mother and her sister Catherine. Her siblings were Isabella, Queen of Portugal; John, Prince of Asturias; Maria, Queen of Portugal; and Catherine, Queen of England.

=== Education ===
Joanna was educated and formally trained for a significant marriage that, as a royal family alliance, would extend the kingdom's power and security as well as its influence and peaceful relations with other ruling powers. As an Infanta (princess), she was not expected to be heiress to the throne of either Castile or Aragon, although through deaths she later inherited both thrones.

Joanna's academic education consisted of astronomy, canon and civil law, genealogy and heraldry, geography, grammar, history, languages, mathematics, philosophy, reading, spelling and writing. Among the authors of classical literature she read were the Christian poets Juvencus and Prudentius, Church fathers Saint Ambrose, Saint Augustine, Saint Gregory, and Saint Jerome, and the Roman statesman Seneca.

In the Castilian court Joanna's main tutors were the Dominican priest Andrés de Miranda; educator Beatriz Galindo, who was a member of the queen's court; and her mother, the queen. Joanna's royal education included baking, chess, cooking, court etiquette, dancing, drawing, equestrian skills, good manners, music, the needle arts of embroidery, lace making, needlepoint, sewing, spinning, and weaving, and singing. She learned outdoor pursuits such as hawking and hunting. Joanna was skilled at dance and music as she played the guitar, the clavichord, the lute, and the monochord.

=== Marriage ===
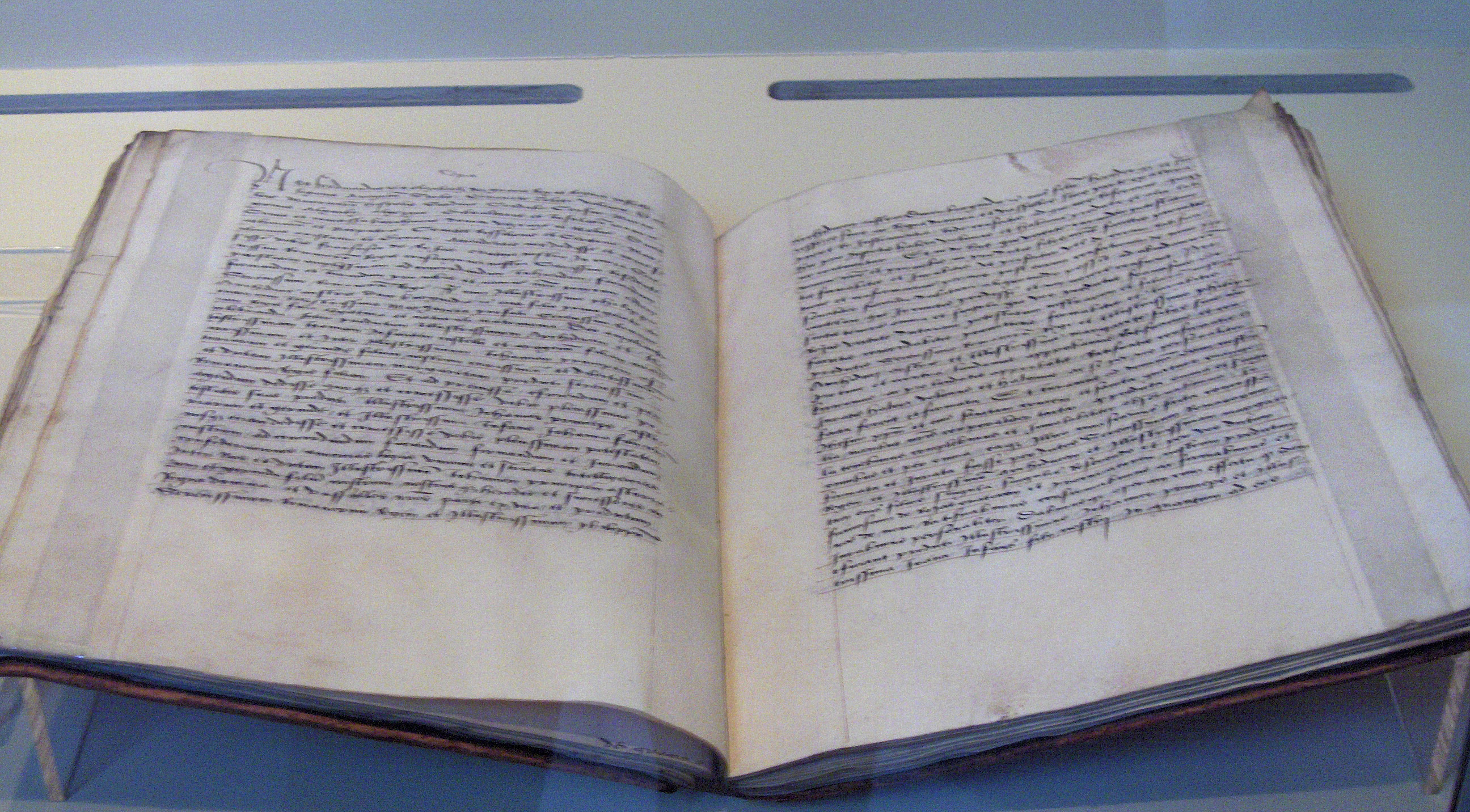
The marriage contract of Joanna and Philip (1496).

In 1496, 16-year-old Joanna was betrothed to 18-year-old Philip of Austria, in the Low Countries. Philip's parents were Maximilian I, Holy Roman Emperor, and his first wife, Duchess Mary of Burgundy. The marriage was one of a set of family alliances between the Habsburgs and the Trastámaras designed to strengthen both against growing French power.

Joanna entered a proxy marriage at the Palacio de los Vivero in the city of Valladolid, Castile, where her parents had secretly married in 1469. In August 1496 Joanna left from the port of Laredo in northern Castile on the Atlantic's Bay of Biscay. Except for 1506, when she saw her younger sister Catherine, the then-Dowager Princess of Wales, she would never see her siblings again.

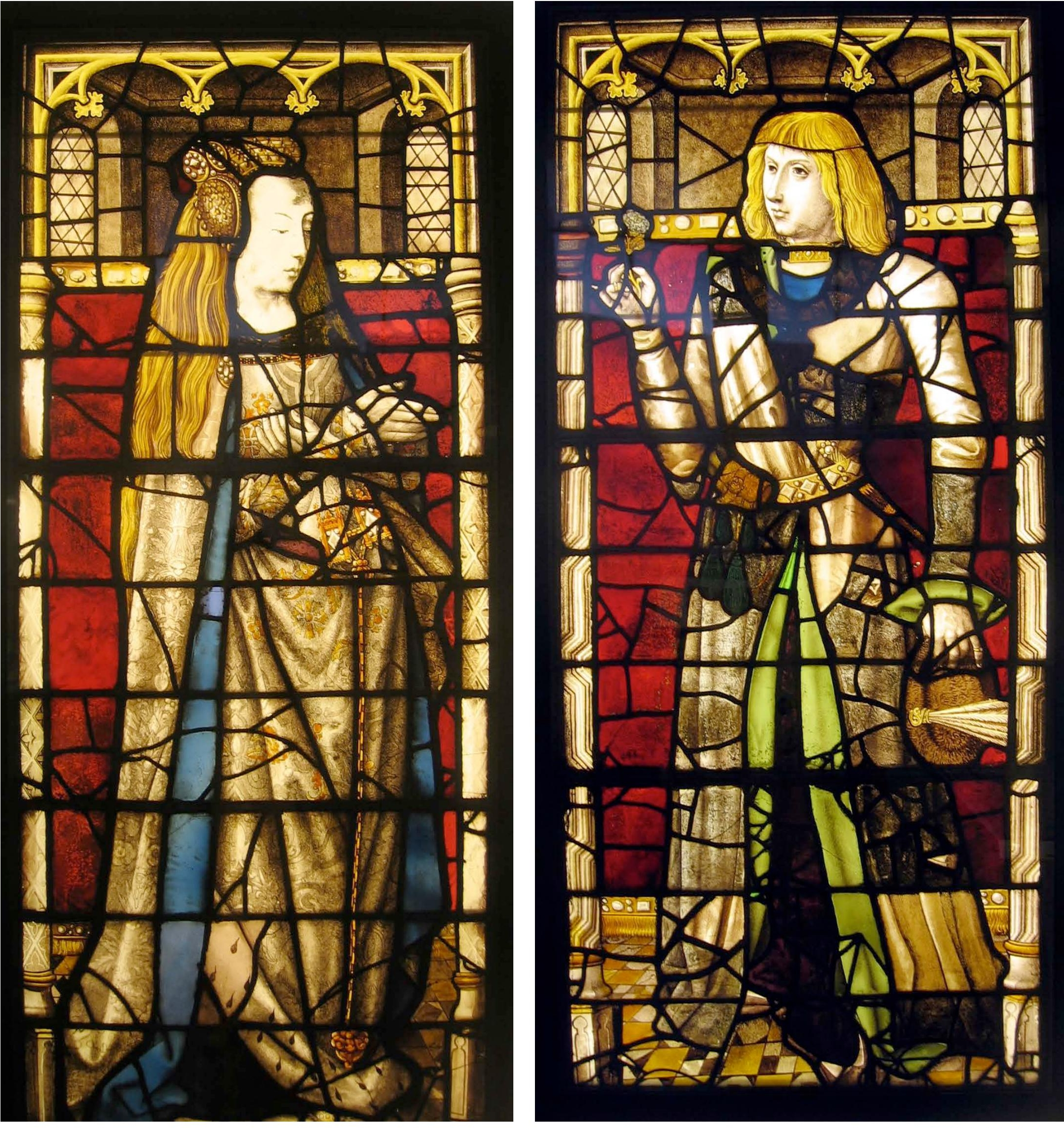
Joanna of Castile and Philip the Fair, stained glass, Basilica of the Holy Blood in Bruges.

Joanna began her journey to Brabant in the Low Countries, which consisted of parts of the present day Netherlands, Belgium, Luxembourg, France, and Germany, on 22 August 1496. The formal marriage took place on 20 October 1496 in Lier, north of present-day Brussels. Between 1498 and 1507, she gave birth to six children, two boys and four girls, all of whom grew up to be either emperors or queens.

=== Princess of Asturias ===
The death of Joanna's brother John, the stillbirth of John's daughter, and the deaths of Joanna's older sister Isabella and Isabella's son Miguel made Joanna heiress to the Spanish kingdoms. Her remaining siblings were Maria (1482–1517) and Catherine (1485–1536), younger than Joanna by three and six years respectively.

In 1502, the Castilian Cortes of Toro recognised Joanna as heiress to the Castilian throne and Philip as her consort. She was named Princess of Asturias, the title traditionally given to the heir of Castile. Also in 1502, the Aragonese Cortes gathered in Zaragoza to swear an oath to Joanna as heiress; however, the Archbishop of Zaragoza, Alonso de Aragón expressed firmly that this oath could only establish jurisprudence by way of a formal agreement on the succession between the Cortes and the king.

In 1502, Philip, Joanna and a large part of their court traveled to Toledo for Joanna to receive fealty from the Cortes of Castile as Princess of Asturias, heiress to the Castilian throne, a journey chronicled in great detail by Antoon I van Lalaing (French: Antoine de Lalaing). Philip and the majority of the court returned to the Low Countries in the following year, leaving a pregnant Joanna in Madrid, where she gave birth to her fourth child, Ferdinand, later a central European monarch and Holy Roman Emperor as Ferdinand I.

== Reign ==
=== Queen of Castile ===
==== Succession ====
Upon the death of her mother in November 1504, Joanna became queen regnant of Castile and her husband jure uxoris its king in 1506. Joanna's father, Ferdinand II, lost his monarchical status in Castile although his wife's will permitted him to govern in Joanna's absence or, if Joanna was unwilling to rule herself, until Joanna's heir reached the age of 20.

Ferdinand refused to accept this; he minted Castilian coins in the name of "Ferdinand and Joanna, King and Queen of Castile, León and Aragon", and, in early 1505, persuaded the Cortes that Joanna's "illness is such that the said Queen Doña Joanna our Lady cannot govern". The Cortes then appointed Ferdinand as Joanna's guardian and the kingdom's administrator and governor.

Joanna's husband, Philip, was unwilling to accept any threat to his chances of ruling Castile and also minted coins in the name of "Philip and Joanna, King and Queen of Castile, Léon and Archdukes of Austria, etc." In response, Ferdinand embarked upon a pro-French policy, marrying Germaine de Foix, niece of Louis XII of France (and his own great-niece), in the hope that she would produce a son to inherit Aragon and perhaps Castile.

In the Low Countries, Joanna was kept in confinement, but when her father-in-law Maximilian (in semi-secrecy) visited them on 24 August 1505 she was released to welcome him. Maximilian tried to comfort Joanna with festivities and she spent weeks accompanying him in public events, during which she acted like a wise, prudent queen, as noted by the Venetian ambassador. (Note: [...] the most serene king of the Romans was keeping company with the queen his daughter-in-law, dressed in black velvet and with a fairly good complexion given the illness she has had. And it seemed to me, although it was night, that she was very beautiful, and she had the air of a wise and prudent lady. I made my reverence to her majesty in the name of your sublimity and spoke a few good words well adapted and appropriate to the time and place where we were and these were amiably reciprocated by her majesty.") To entertain Joanna, Philip and Maximilian (who was dressed incognito) jousted against each other at night, under torchlight. Maximilian told Philip that he could only succeed as a monarch if husband and wife were "una cosa medesima" (one and the same). After this, the couple reconciled somewhat. When Philip tried to gain support from Castilian nobles and prelates against Ferdinand though, Joanna firmly refused to act against her father.

Ferdinand's remarriage merely strengthened support for Philip and Joanna in Castile, and in late 1505 the pair decided to travel to Castile. Before they boarded the ship, Joanna forbade a ship with female attendants to join the trip, fearing that Philip would have illicit relationships with them. This action played right into Philip's and Ferdinand's propaganda against her. Leaving Flanders on 10 January 1506, their ships were wrecked on the English coast and the couple were guests of Henry, Prince of Wales (later Henry VIII), and Joanna's sister Catherine of Aragon at Windsor Castle. They weren't able to leave until 21 April, by which time civil war was looming in Castile.

Philip apparently considered landing in Andalusia and summoning the nobles to take up arms against Ferdinand in Aragon. Instead, he and Joanna landed at A Coruña on 26 April, whereupon the Castilian nobility abandoned Ferdinand en masse. Ferdinand met Philip at Villafáfila on 27 June 1506 for a private interview in the village church. To the general surprise, Ferdinand had unexpectedly handed over the government of Castile to his "most beloved children", promising to retire to Aragon. Philip and Ferdinand then signed the Treaty of Villafáfila secretly, agreeing that Joanna's "infirmities and sufferings" made her incapable of ruling and promising to exclude her from government and deprive the Queen of crown and freedom.

Ferdinand promptly repudiated the second agreement the same afternoon, declaring that Joanna should never be deprived of her rights as Queen Proprietress of Castile. A fortnight later, having come to no fresh agreement with Philip, and thus effectively retaining his right to interfere if he considered his daughter's rights to have been infringed upon, he abandoned Castile for Aragon, leaving Philip to govern in Joanna's stead.

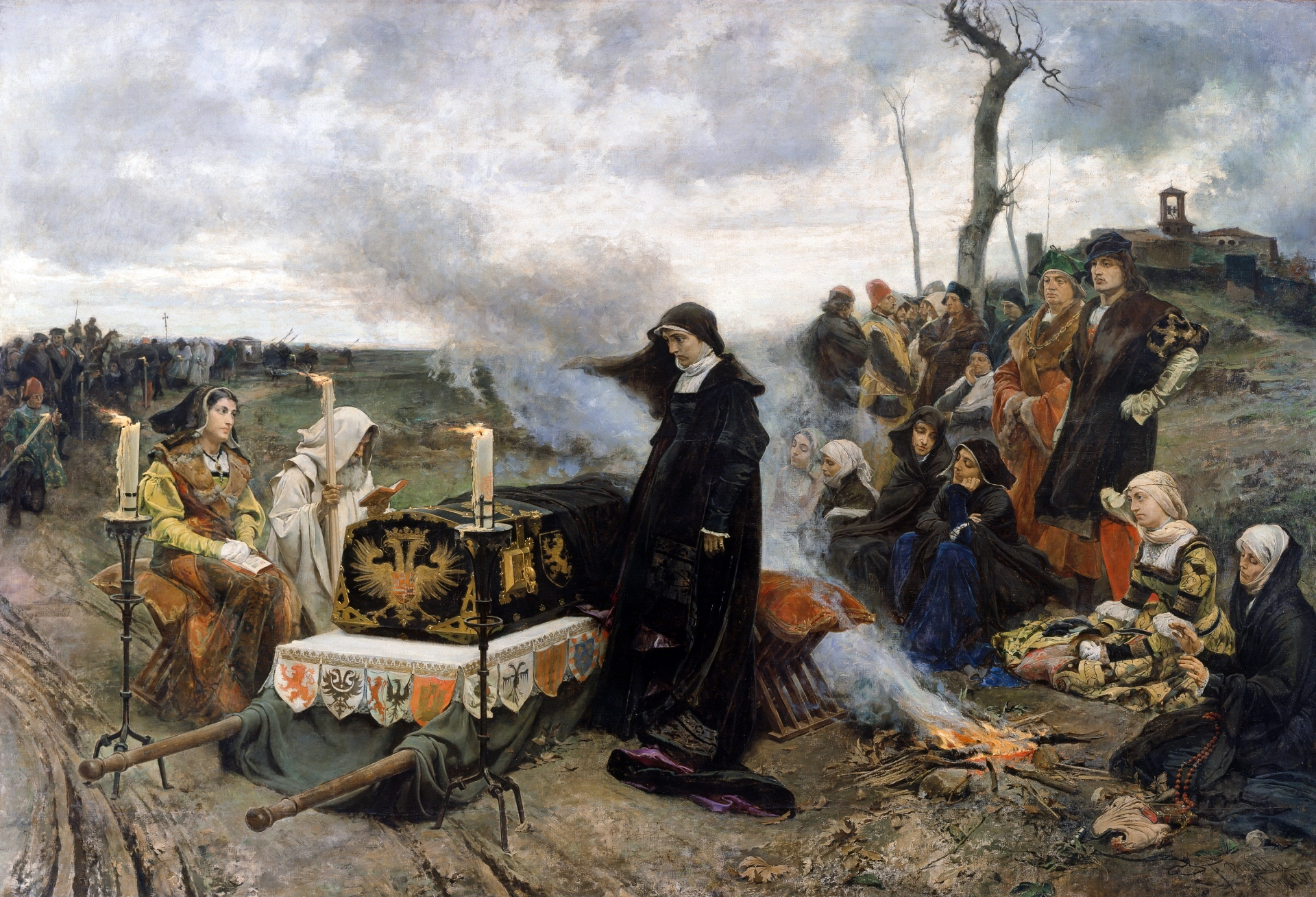
Joanna the Mad Holding Vigil over the Coffin of Her Late Husband, Philip the Handsome. Juana la Loca de Pradilla by Francisco Pradilla Ortiz, 1877.

==== Philip's death ====
By virtue of the agreement of Villafáfila, the procurators of the Cortes met in Valladolid, Castile on 9 July 1506. On 12 July, they swore allegiance to Philip I and Joanna together as King and Queen of Castile and León and to their son Charles as their heir apparent. This arrangement only lasted for a few months.

On 25 September 1506, Philip died after a five-day illness in the city of Burgos in Castile. The probable cause of death was typhoid fever but there were rumors that his father-in-law, Ferdinand II, had poisoned him. Joanna was pregnant with their sixth child, a daughter named Catherine (1507–1578), who later became Queen of Portugal. As Joanna had no midwife at the time, she was assisted during childbirth by her lady-in-waiting, María de Ulloa.

By 20 December 1506, Joanna was in the village of Torquemada in Castile, attempting to exercise her rights to rule alone in her own name as Queen of Castile. The country fell into disorder. Her son and heir apparent Charles, later Charles I, was a six-year-old child being raised in his aunt's care in northern European Flanders; her father, Ferdinand II, remained in Aragon, allowing the crisis to grow.

A regency council under Archbishop Cisneros was set up, against the queen's orders, but it was unable to manage the growing public disorder; plague and famine devastated the kingdom with supposedly half the population perishing of one or the other. The queen was unable to secure the funds required to assist her to protect her power. In the face of this, Ferdinand II returned to Castile in July 1507. His arrival coincided with a remission of the plague and famine, a development which quieted the instability and left an impression that his return had restored the health of the kingdom.

==== Father's regency ====
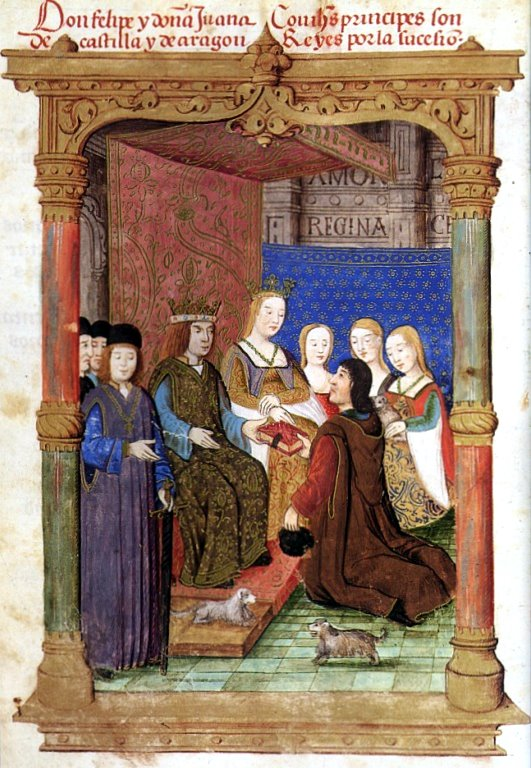
Joanna and her husband with their Spanish subjects

Ferdinand II and Joanna met at Hornillos, Castile, on 30 July 1507. Ferdinand then constrained her to yield her power over the Kingdom of Castile and León to himself. On 17 August 1507, three members of the royal council were summoned – supposedly in her name – and ordered to inform the grandees of her father Ferdinand II's return to power: "That they should go to receive his highness and serve him as they would her person and more." However, she made it evident that this was against her will, by refusing to sign the instructions and issuing a statement that as queen regnant she did not endorse the surrender of her own royal powers.

Nonetheless, she was thereafter queen in name only, and all documents, though issued in her name, were signed with Ferdinand's signature, "I the King". He was named administrator of the kingdom by the Cortes of Castile in 1510, and entrusted the government mainly to Archbishop Cisneros. He had Joanna confined in the Royal Palace in Tordesillas, near Valladolid in Castile, in February 1509 after having dismissed all of her faithful servants and having appointed a small retinue accountable to him alone. At this time, some accounts claim that she was insane or "mad", and that she took her husband's corpse with her to Tordesillas to keep it close to her.

==== Son as co-monarch ====
As a result of the death of her father, Ferdinand II, on 23 January 1516, Joanna became Queen of Aragon. Cisneros and the regency council hid the news of her father's death from her, pretending he still lived and ruled. Her then-17-year-old son Charles arrived in Asturias at the Bay of Biscay in October 1517. Until his arrival, the Crown of Aragon was governed by Archbishop Alonso de Aragón (an illegitimate son of Ferdinand) and her Crown of Castile was governed by Cardinal Francisco Jiménez de Cisneros. On 4 November, Charles and his sister Eleanor met their mother Joanna at Tordesillas – there they secured from her the necessary authorisation to allow Charles to rule as her co-King of Castile and León and of Aragon. Despite her acquiescence to his wishes, her confinement would continue and Charles expanded the deceptions surrounding her, later hiding the 1519 death of Emperor Maximilian from her. The Castilian Cortes, meeting in Valladolid, spited Charles by addressing him only as Su Alteza ("Your Highness") and reserving Majestad ("Majesty") for Joanna. However, no one seriously considered rule by Joanna a realistic proposition.

In 1519, Charles I ruled the Crown of Aragon and its territories and the Crown of Castile and its territories, in personal union. In addition, that same year Charles was elected Holy Roman Emperor. The kingdoms of Castile and Aragon (and Navarre) remained in personal union until their jurisdictional unification in the early 18th century by the Nueva Planta decrees, while Charles eventually abdicated as Emperor of the Holy Roman Empire in favour of his brother Ferdinand, and as King of Spain in favour of his son Philip – an act that represented the "transition from a universal empire to defence of the interests of the 'Austrian family' (austriacismo), in other words, to a close alliance between two parts of the dynasty, aimed at guaranteeing the hegemony of Catholicism and of the dynasty within Europe".

==== Revolt of the Comuneros ====
In 1520, the Revolt of the Comuneros broke out in response to the perceived foreign Habsburg influence over Castile through Charles V. The rebel leaders demanded that Castile be governed in accordance with the supposed practices of the Catholic Monarchs. In an attempt to legitimise their rebellion, the Comuneros turned to Joanna. As the sovereign monarch, had she given written approval to the rebellion, it would have been legalised and would have triumphed.

In an attempt to prevent this, Don Antonio de Rojas Manrique, Bishop of Mallorca, led a delegation of royal councillors to Tordesillas, asking Joanna to sign a document denouncing the Comuneros. She demurred, requesting that he present her specific provisions. Before this could be done, the Comuneros in turn stormed the virtually undefended city and requested her support.

The request prompted Adrian of Utrecht, the regent appointed by Charles V, to declare that Charles would lose Castile if she granted her support. Although she was sympathetic to the Comuneros, she was persuaded by Ochoa de Landa and her confessor Fray John of Ávila that supporting the revolt would irreparably damage the country and her son's kingship, and she therefore refused to sign a document granting her support. The Battle of Villalar confirmed that Charles would prevail over the revolt.

==== Forced confinement ====
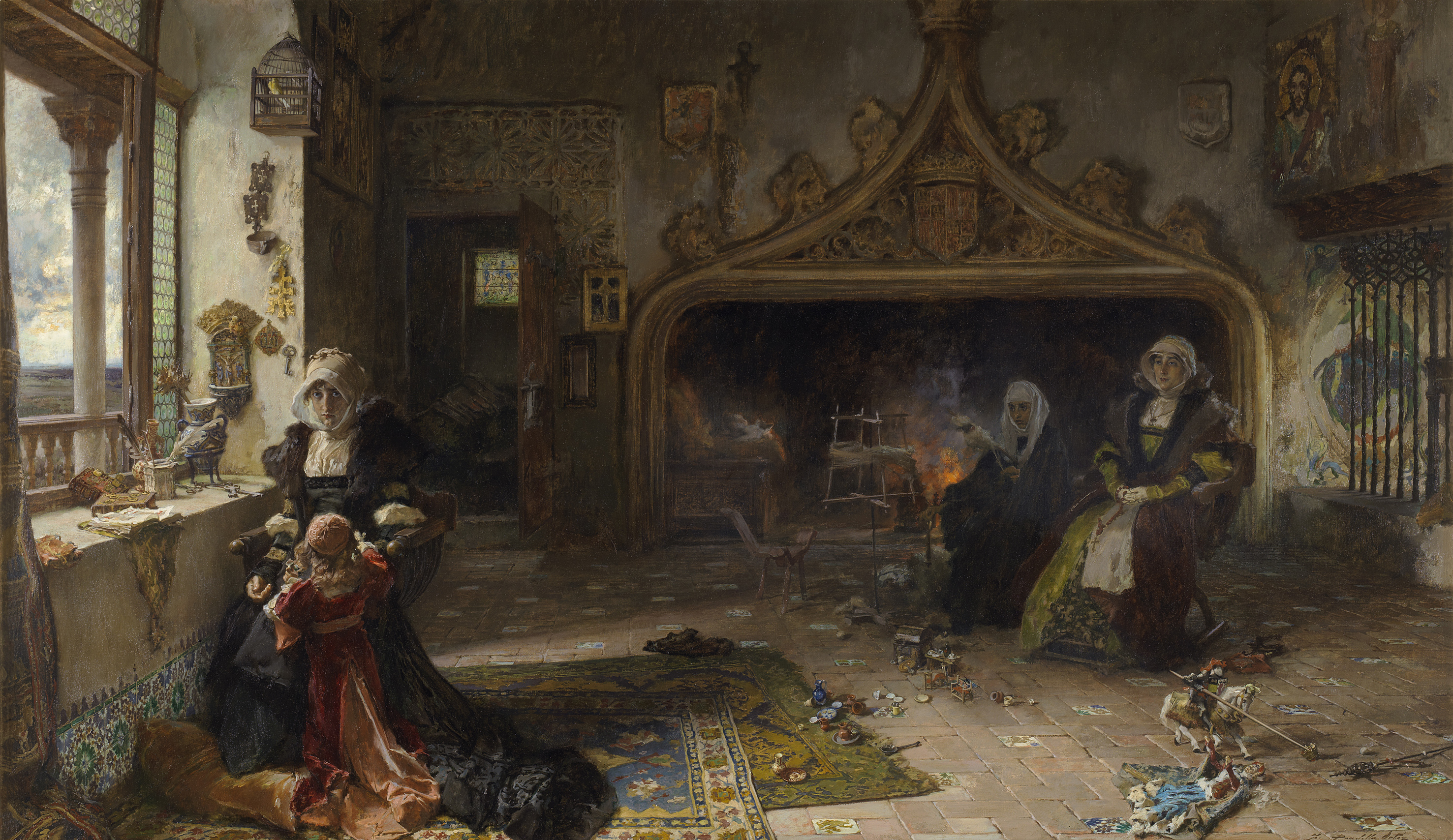
Queen Joanna the Mad, confined in Tordesillas with her daughter, the Infanta Catherine — Francisco Pradilla y Ortiz, (1817) Prado Museum, Madrid

Charles ensured his domination and throne by having his mother confined for the rest of her life in the now-demolished Royal Palace in Tordesillas, Castile. Joanna's condition degenerated further. She apparently became convinced that some of the nuns that took care of her wanted to kill her. Reportedly it was difficult for her to eat, sleep, bathe, or change her clothes. Charles wrote to her caretakers: "It seems to me that the best and most suitable thing for you to do is to make sure that no person speaks with Her Majesty, for no good could come from it".

Her late mother's lady-in-waiting, Catalina de Medrano y Bravo de Lagunas, along with her husband, Hernando de Sandoval y Rojas, took part in the custody and care of Joanna in Tordesillas. Joanna also had her youngest daughter, Catherine of Austria, with her during Ferdinand II's time as regent, 1507–1516. Her older daughter, Eleanor of Austria, had created a semblance of a household within the palace rooms. In her final years, Joanna's physical state began to decline rapidly, with mobility ever more difficult.

== Death ==
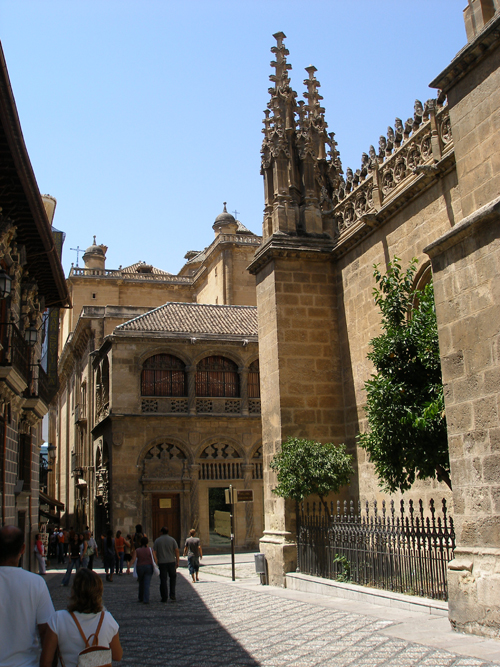
The Capilla Real in Granada, where Joanna is entombed

Joanna died from unknown causes on Good Friday, 12 April 1555, at the age of 75 in the Royal Palace at Tordesillas. She is entombed in the Royal Chapel of Granada in Spain, alongside her parents, Isabella I and Ferdinand II, her husband Philip I and her nephew Miguel da Paz, Prince of Asturias.

== Disputed mental health claims ==
As a young woman, Joanna was known to be highly intelligent. Claims regarding her as "mad" are widely disputed. It was only after her marriage that the first suspicions of mental illness arose. Some historians believe she may have had melancholia, a depressive disorder, a psychosis, or a case of inherited schizophrenia. She may also have been unjustly painted as "mad" as her husband Philip the Handsome and her father, Ferdinand, had a great deal to gain from Joanna being declared sick or incompetent to rule.

The narrative of her purported mental illness is perpetuated in stories of the mental illness of her maternal grandmother, Isabella of Portugal, Queen of Castile, who, in widowhood, was exiled by her stepson to the castle of Arévalo in Ávila, Castile.

== Legacy ==
William Geets, 1876, Exorcism of Joanna of Castile, Royal Museum of Fine Arts, Antwerp

Bethany Aram argues that while she seemed to be unable or unwilling to rule herself, Joanna's major (political) significance lay with her defense of the rights of her descendants and thus the Habsburg dynasty. While she did have affection for Philip, her refusal to bury her husband (and attempt to bring his corpse to Granada so that he would lie beside her mother) was likely an attempt to ward off suitors and create a connection between Charles and Castile. Facing the leaders of the Comunero Revolt, she again chose the Habsburg dynasty over her Castilian heritage. Her fecundity provided Charles with many Habsburg siblings (and by extensions, these siblings' children) who upheld his rule. Sara T. Nalle agrees with Aram that this was Joanna's major success, while pointing out that Aram seems to gloss over the fact that Joanna's contemporaries did see her as different. Nalle opines that overall, Joanna was a troubled individual who, not trained for the political world, found herself surrounded by strong personalities, and had to face a shocking amount of cruelty and deceit.

== Arms ==
Coat of arms as consort of Philip the Handsome

Coat of arms as consort and Princess of Asturias and Girona

Coat of arms as Queen of Castile

== Children ==
Name	Birth	Death	Notes
Eleanor	15 November 1498	25 February 1558 (aged 59)	first marriage in 1518, Manuel I of Portugal and had 2 children; second marriage in 1530, Francis I of France and had no children.
Charles	24 February 1500	21 September 1558 (aged 58)	married in 1526, Isabella of Portugal and had 7 children.
Isabella	18 July 1501	19 January 1526 (aged 24)	married in 1515, Christian II of Denmark and had 6 children.
Ferdinand	10 March 1503	25 July 1564 (aged 61)	married in 1521, Anna of Bohemia and Hungary and had 15 children.
Mary	18 September 1505	18 October 1558 (aged 53)	married in 1522, Louis II of Hungary and Bohemia and had no children.
Catherine	14 January 1507	12 February 1578 (aged 71)	married in 1525, John III of Portugal and had 9 children.

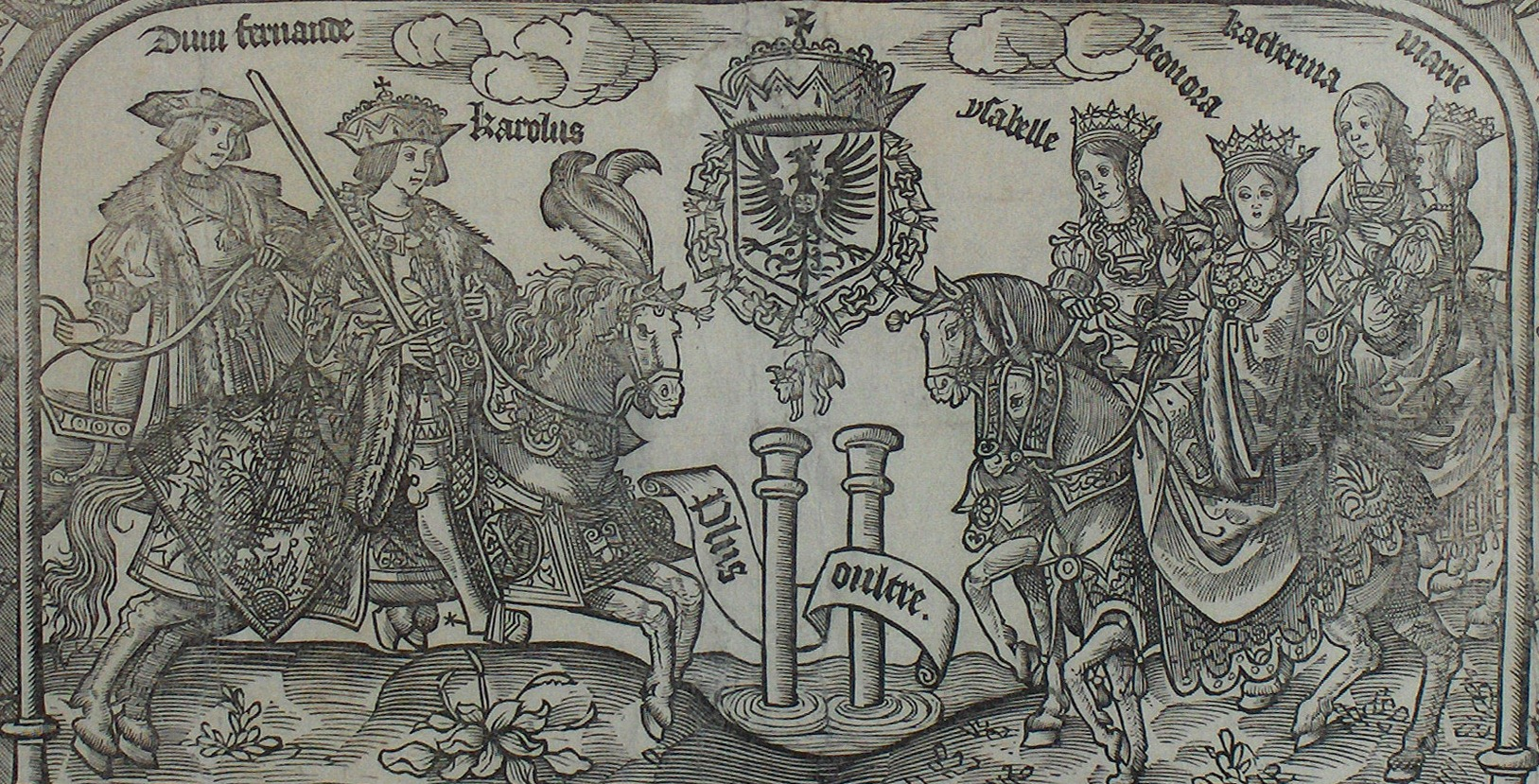
The children of Phillip and Joanna

== Ancestry ==
Ancestors of Joanna of Castile

8. Ferdinand I of Aragon
4. John II of Aragon
9. Eleanor of Alburquerque
2. Ferdinand II of Aragon
10. Fadrique Enríquez
5. Juana Enríquez
11. Mariana Fernández de Córdoba
1. Joanna of Castile
12. Henry III of Castile
6. John II of Castile
13. Catherine of Lancaster
3. Isabella I of Castile
14. John, Constable of Portugal
7. Isabella of Portugal
15. Isabel of Barcelos

== Bibliography ==
Biographies

- Prawdin, Michael, The Mad Queen of Spain (1939)
- Dennis, Amarie, Seek the Darkness: The Story of Juana La Loca, (1945)
- Prescott, William H., History of Ferdinand and Isabella (1854)
- Rosier, Johanna die Wahnsinnige (1890)
- Tighe, Harry, A Queen of Unrest: The Story of Juana of Castile, Mother of Charles V., Born 1479, Died 1555 (1907).
- Villa, R., La Reina doña Juana la Loca (1892)
- Aram, Bethany, Juana the Mad: Sovereignty and Dynasty in Renaissance Europe (Baltimore: Johns Hopkins University Press, 2005).
- Fleming, Gillian B., Juana I: Legitimacy and Conflict in Sixteenth Century Castile (London: Palgrave Macmillan, 2018).
- Assini, Adriana, Le rose di Cordova, Scrittura & Scritture, Napoli 2007
- Fox, Julia, Sister Queens: The Noble, Tragic Lives of Katherine of Aragon and Juana, Queen of Castile (New York: Ballantine Books, 2011).
- Bergenroth, G A. Introduction, Part 1, Calendar of State Papers, Spain; vol. 1, 1485–1509, (London, 1862), p. xlvii. British History Online http://www.british-history.ac.uk/cal-state-papers/spain/vol1

Works cited

- Miller, Townsend, Castles and the Crown. Coward-McCann: New York, 1963
- Aram, Bethany, "Juana 'the Mad's' Signature: The Problem of Invoking Royal Authority, 1505–1507" The Sixteenth Century Journal, Vol. 29, No. 2 (Summer, 1998), pp. 331-358.
- Elliott, J. H. (1963). Imperial Spain, 1469–1716.
- de Francisco Olmos, José María: Estudio documental de la moneda castellana de Juana la Loca fabricada en los Países Bajos (1505–1506), Revista General de Información y Documentación 2002, vol. 12, núm. 2 (Universidad complutense de Madrid).
- de Francisco Olmos, José María: Estudio documental de la moneda castellana de Carlos I fabricada en los Países Bajos (1517); Revista General de Información y Documentación 2003, vol. 13, núm. 2 (Universidad complutense de Madrid).
- Juan-Navarro, Santiago; Maria Gomez; and Phyllis Zatlin. Juana of Castile: History and Myth of the Mad Queen. Newark and London: Bucknell University Press, 2008.

Joanna of Castile House of Trastámara Born: 6 November 1479 Died: 12 April 1555
Regnal titles
Preceded by Isabella I and Ferdinand V	Queen of Castile and León; 1504–1555 with Philip I (1506); Ferdinand V (1506-1516); Charles I (1516–1555)	Succeeded by Charles I
Preceded by Ferdinand II	Queen of Aragon, Sicily, Sardinia, Valencia, Majorca, Naples, and Navarre; Countess of Barcelona, Roussillon and Cerdagne; 1516–1555 with Charles I (1516–1555)	Succeeded by Charles I
Spanish royalty
Vacant Title last held by Miguel of Portugal	Princess of Girona; 1502–1509	Succeeded by John of Aragon
Vacant Title last held by Miguel of Portugal	Princess of Asturias; 1502–1504	Succeeded by Charles of Austria
Preceded by John of Aragon	Princess of Girona; 1509–1516	Succeeded by Charles of Austria
