= María Sidonia Riederer de Parr =

María Sidonia Riederer de Parr (died 1624), was a Spanish courtier. She was the influential favorite and confidante of Margaret of Austria, Queen of Spain.

She and the chaplain Haller are noted to have been the two favorites and confidantes of the queen. She participated in the queen's party at court, together with among others Maria of Austria, Holy Roman Empress and Archduchess Margaret of Austria (1567–1633), which worked to depose the powerful favorite of the king, Francisco Gómez de Sandoval, 1st Duke of Lerma.
