= Diego, Prince of Asturias =

Spanish and Portuguese prince

Diego
- Prince of Asturias and Portugal
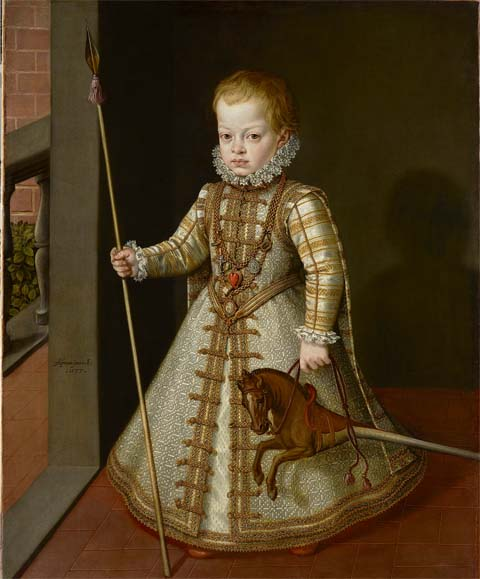
- Portrait of Prince Diego aged 2 by Sánchez Coello, c. 1577
- Born: 15 August 1575; Madrid, Crown of Castile, Spain
- Died: 21 November 1582 (aged 7); Madrid, Crown of Castile, Spain
- Burial: El Escorial
Names
- Diego Felix
- House: Habsburg
- Father: Philip II of Spain
- Mother: Anna of Austria

Diego, Prince of Asturias and Portugal (Diego Felix; 15 August 1575 – 21 November 1582) was the fourth son of Philip II of Spain and his third son by his fourth wife, Anna of Austria.

== Early life ==
At the time of his birth, Diego's elder brother, Prince Ferdinand, was still the heir apparent. On the death of Ferdinand in 1578, Diego became heir apparent to the throne.

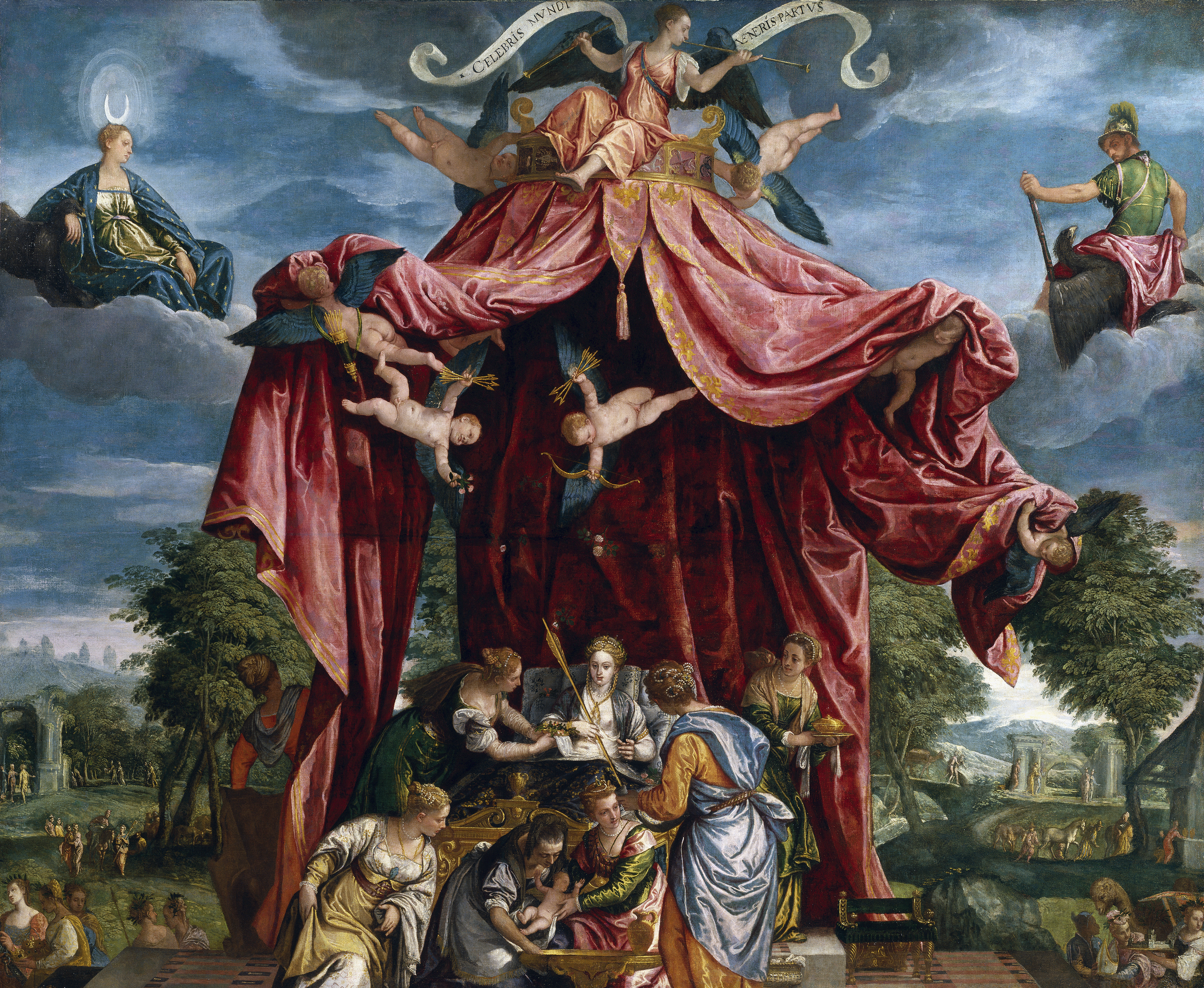
The birth of Ferdinand, Prince of Asturias, Diego's elder brother

He was formally invested as Prince of Asturias on 1 March 1580 by the Courts in Madrid. The poet Cristóbal de Virués dedicated a sonnet to the new Prince, where he proposed that Diego follow the steps of his father.

In 1580, his father became king of Portugal as well, making Diego heir apparent of that realm also. His mother, Anna, died during a trip to their new kingdom. Diego and his siblings remained in Madrid under the care of their half-sisters Isabella Clara Eugenia and Catherine Michelle. The letters of Philip II make clear that he was extremely proud of Diego: he wrote that his son had already learned the alphabet and dancing by the age of five. In a letter dated 1582, the king wrote to the Indian Viceroy Francisco de Mascarenhas commanding that he bring an elephant to the Prince of Asturias as a gift. Philip II taught his son the Portuguese language so that one day Diego could speak as king with his Portuguese subjects. In addition, Philip II planned to betroth Diego to one of the daughters of John, Duke of Braganza, and Catherine of Portugal, thus strengthening his claim to the Portuguese throne.

== Death ==
In late 1582, he contracted smallpox and died at the age of 7. At his death, Philip II was inconsolable, for the only heir apparent to the throne remaining was the small and sickly Infante Philip, who assumed the position of Prince of Asturias. The King gave orders that continuous prayers be said at the Church of Our Blessed Lady in Zaragoza for the health of the royal children remaining.

Diego's younger brother became King Philip III upon their father's death in 1598.

== Ancestry ==
Ancestors of Diego, Prince of Asturias

16. Maximilian I, Holy Roman Emperor
8. Philip I of Castile
17. Mary, Duchess of Burgundy
4. Charles V, Holy Roman Emperor
18. Ferdinand II of Aragon
9. Joanna I of Castile
19. Isabella I of Castile
2. Philip II of Spain
20. Infante Fernando, Duke of Viseu
10. Manuel I of Portugal
21. Beatriz of Portugal
5. Isabella of Portugal
22. Ferdinand II of Aragon (= 18)
11. Maria of Aragon
23. Isabella I of Castile (= 19)
1. Diego, Prince of Asturias
24. Philip I of Castile (= 8)
12. Ferdinand I, Holy Roman Emperor
25. Joanna I of Castile (= 9)
6. Maximilian II, Holy Roman Emperor
26. Vladislaus II of Bohemia and Hungary
13. Anna of Bohemia and Hungary
27. Anna of Foix-Candale
3. Anna of Austria
28. Philip I of Castile (= 8)
14. Charles V, Holy Roman Emperor (= 4)
29. Joanna I of Castile (= 9)
7. Maria of Spain
30. Manuel I of Portugal (= 10)
15. Isabella of Portugal (= 5)
31. Maria of Aragon (= 11)

Diego, Prince of Asturias Spanish Habsburgs Born: 15 August 1575 Died: 21 November 1582
Spanish royalty
| Preceded by Ferdinand | Prince of Asturias; 1578–1582 | Succeeded by Philip |
| Preceded by Emanuel | Prince of Portugal; 1581–1582 | Succeeded by Philip |
