= History of elephants in Europe =

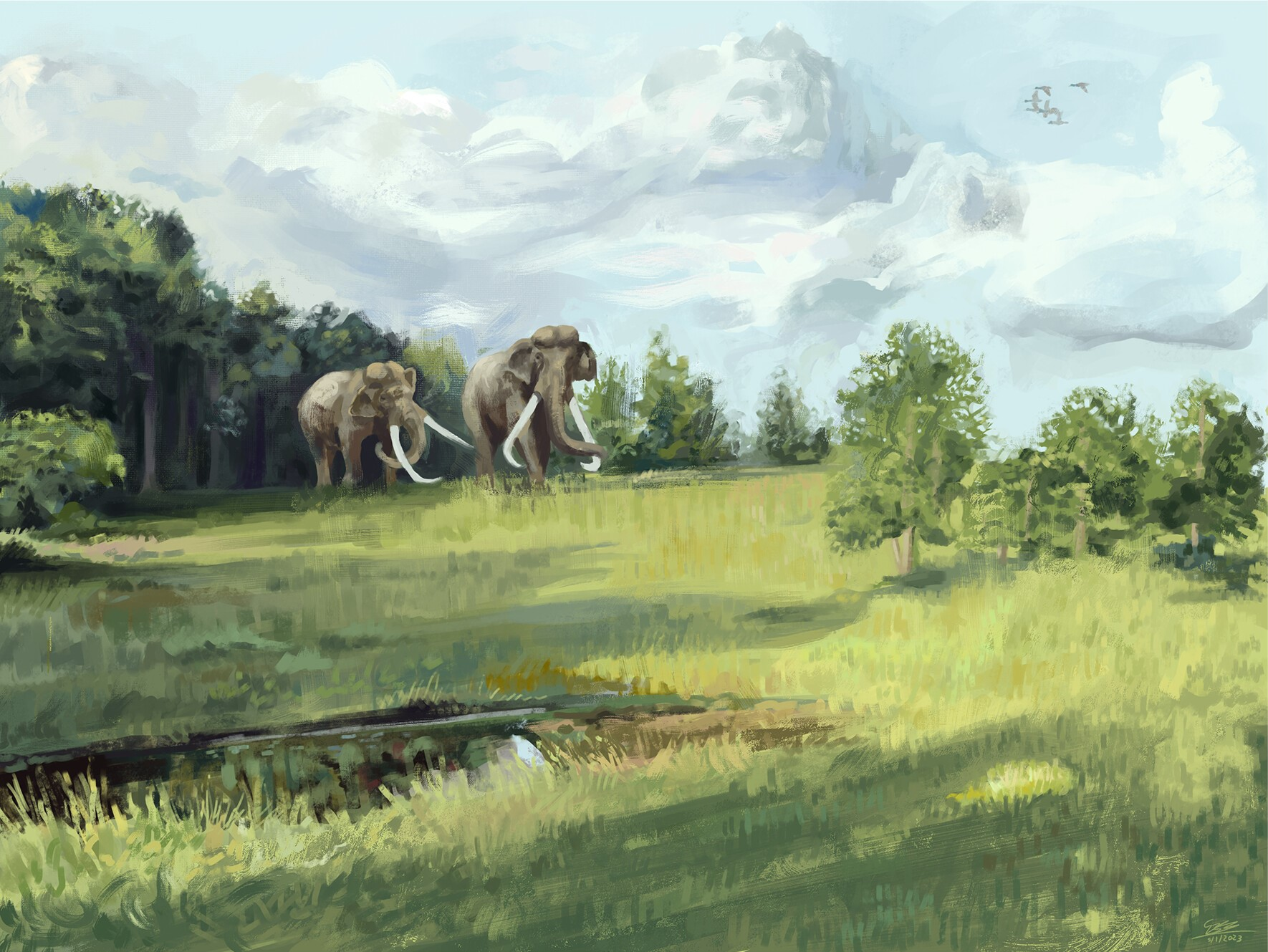
Life restoration of two straight-tusked elephants during the Eemian interglacial (130,000-115,000 years ago) in a European temperate forest landscape.

The presence of elephants in Europe in historical times dates back to classical antiquity, but previously, during Pleistocene and before, relatives of elephants were spread across the globe, including Europe. Mammoths (which are a kind of elephant) arrived in Europe during the Pliocene, around 3.2 million years ago. The large straight-tusked elephant arrived in Europe around 800,000-700,000 years ago, reaching a widespread distribution across the continent during warm interglacial periods. Both mammoths and the straight-tusked elephant underwent speciation into several varieties of dwarf elephants on Mediterranean islands. Mammoths, straight-tusked elephants and their dwarf descendants became extinct in Europe around 50,000-10,000 years ago as part of the Late Pleistocene megafauna extinctions (though some authors have argued that the dwarf elephant species Palaeoloxodon tiliensis may have survived until 1500 BC). Subsequently the presence of actual elephants in Europe was only due to importation of these animals.

== Overview ==
Europeans came in contact with live elephants in 327 BC, when Alexander the Great descended into India from the Hindu Kush, but Alexander was quick to adopt them. Four elephants guarded his tent, and shortly after his death his associate Ptolemy issued coins showing Alexander in the elephant headdress that became a royal emblem also in the Hellenized East. Aristotle depended on first-hand information for his account of elephants, but like most Westerners he believed the animals live for two hundred years. Roman scouts in the royal Syrian parks shortly before the last of the Seleucids fell to Rome had orders to hamstring every elephant they could capture, and while elephants performed in the circuses of Rome, Shapur's war elephants in the mid-4th century numbered in the hundreds (Fox 1973 p 338).

Elephants largely disappeared from Europe after the Roman Empire. As exotic and expensive animals, they were exchanged as presents between European rulers, who exhibited them as luxury pets, beginning with Harun ar-Rashid's gift of an elephant to Charlemagne.

== Examples ==
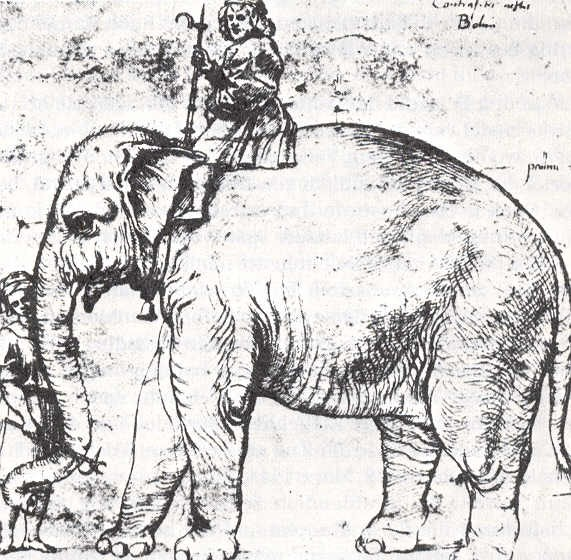
Sketch of Hanno and mahout, after Raphael, c. 1514.

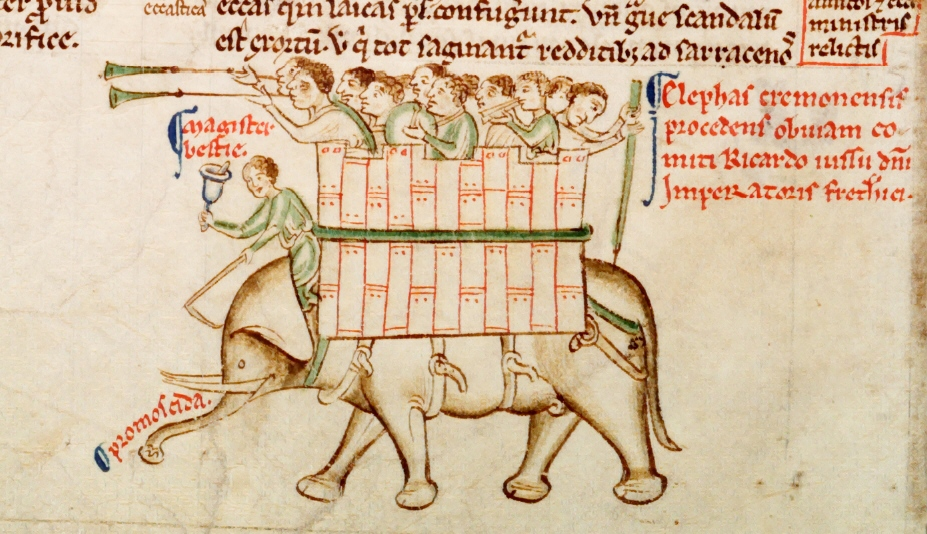
The Cremona elephant as depicted in the Chronica maiora, Part II, Parker Library, MS 16, fol. 151v

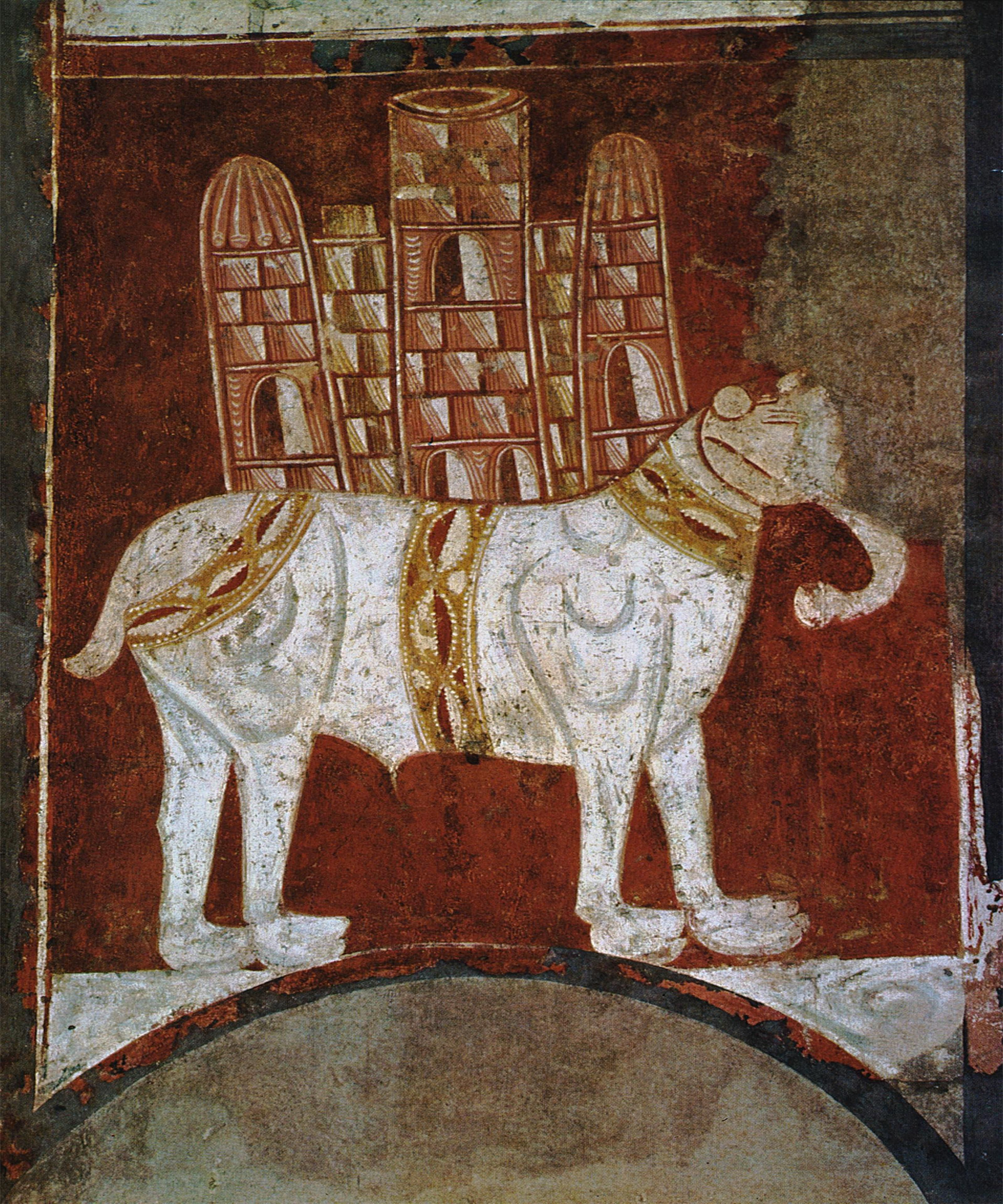
A Romanesque painting of a war elephant, believed to be Abul-Abbas. Spain, 11th century.

Historical accounts of elephants in Europe include:

- The 20 (Note: Contemporary accounts report a significantly higher number of elephants: Pliny the Elder records 142 "or, as some say", 140; in the Epitome of Livy and by Seneca, the number is 120; Florus says that they were "about a hundred".) elephants in the army of Pyrrhus of Epirus, which landed at Tarentum in 280 BC for the first Battle of Heraclea, recorded by Plutarch's (in Lives), Polybius, Dionysius of Halicarnassus and Livy. "The most notable elephant in Greek history, called Victor, had long served in Pyrrhus's army, but on seeing its mahout dead before the city walls, it rushed to retrieve him: hoisting him defiantly on his tusks, it took wild and indiscriminate revenge for the man it loved, trampling more of its supporters than its enemies". Coins of Tarentum after this battle also featured elephants.
- The 37 elephants in Hannibal's army that crossed the Rhône in October/November 218 BC during the Second Punic War, recorded by Livy.
- According to Cassius Dio, writing over 150 years after the events, Roman emperor Claudius brought elephants for his invasion of Britain in 43 AD. This detail is not mentioned in other sources covering the invasion, and Dio never suggests Claudius personally rode an elephant in Britain. The veracity of this account has been doubted both on logistical grounds and based on the rarity use of the usage of war elephants by the Romans, as well as historical accounts showing Roman reluctance to use elephants in warfare. If the elephants did exist they may have been brought to Gaul (perhaps by his predecessor Caligula) but never crossed the channel. His use of the term "elephant" may actually refer to a kind of military machine, perhaps a siege tower. The claim by Polyaenus that Julius Caesar used elephants in his earlier 55 BC invasion of Britain is considered to be probably erroneous, as Caesar never mentions using elephants in his own writings on his wars in Britain and Gaul. At least one skeleton with flint weapons that has been found in England was initially misidentified a Roman war elephant, but later dating proved it to be a mammoth skeleton from the Stone Age.
- Abul-Abbas, the Asian elephant which Harun ar-Rashid gave to Charlemagne in 797 or 802. The animal died in 810, of pneumonia.
- The Annals of Innisfallen record that King Edgar of Scotland gave a large, exotic animal to Muirchertach Ua Briain in 1105, possibly an elephant but more probably a camel. (Annals of Innisfallen, s.a. 1105; A. A. M. Duncan, Scotland: The Making of the Kingdom (1975), p. 128)
- The Cremona elephant presented to Frederick II, Holy Roman Emperor by Al-Kamil in 1229.
- The elephant given by Louis IX of France to Henry III of England, for his menagerie in the Tower of London in 1255 (see: Sandwich, Kent). Drawn from life by the historian Matthew Paris for his Chronica Majora, it was the first elephant to be seen in England since Claudius' war elephant. Matthew Paris' original drawing appears in his bestiary, on display in the Parker Library of Corpus Christi College, Cambridge. The bestiary explains that while in residence at the Tower of London, the elephant enjoyed a diet of prime cuts of beef and expensive red wine, and is claimed to have died in 1257 from drinking too much wine. The accompanying text reveals that at the time, Europeans believed that elephants did not have knees and so were unable to get up if they fell over (the bestiary contains a drawing depicting an elephant on its back being dragged along the ground by another elephant, with a caption stating that elephants lacked knees – compare cow tipping). Europeans also interpreted descriptions of howdahs to mean that Indian elephants were capable of carrying actual stone castles on their backs, albeit only big enough to be garrisoned by three or four men; note that turreted war elephants did exist, though not ones made of stone. A carving of the elephant can be found on a contemporary miserichord in Exeter Cathedral. This animal may be the inspiration for the heraldic device 'Elephant and Castle', the arms of the Cutlers' Company of London, a guild founded in the 13th century responsible for making scissors, knives and the like. Its heraldry survived in an 18th-century pub-sign that in turn gave its name to a largely modern district in South London.
- The elephant given by Afonso V of Portugal to René d'Anjou about 1477.
- The merchants of Cyprus presented Ercole d'Este with an elephant in 1497.
- Suleyman the elephant, a present from the Portuguese king John III to Maximilian II, Holy Roman Emperor. Travelling from Spain in 1551, it arrived in Vienna in 1552, but died in 1554.
- Hanno, or Annone, was a white elephant presented by king Manuel I of Portugal to Pope Leo X on the occasion of his coronation in 1514. He died in 1518, probably of an intestinal obstruction misdiagnosed as angina, with Pope Leo at his side. His story is told in Silvio Bedini's The Pope's Elephant (Nashville: Sanders 1998). At the Villa Madama, in the garden facing the loggia, the Elephant Fountain designed by Giovanni da Udine depicts "Annone", whose tomb was designed by Raphael himself.
- Hansken, a female elephant from Ceylon that became famous in early 17th-century Europe, touring through many countries demonstrating circus tricks, and sketched by Rembrandt and Stefano della Bella.
