= Suleiman (elephant) =

Elephant of Maximilian II

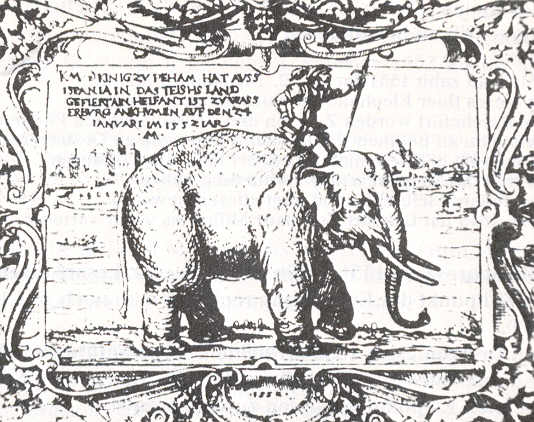
Suleiman at Wasserburg on the River Inn, in a woodcut by Michael Minck dated 24 January 1552.

Suleiman (or Süleyman; Portuguese: Salomão) (c. 1540 – 18 December 1553) was an Asian elephant (Elephas maximus maximus) that was presented to the Habsburg Archduke Maximilian II (later King of Bohemia, King of Hungary, and Holy Roman Emperor) by King John III of Portugal and his wife, Catherine of Austria, Habsburg princess and youngest sister of the Emperor Charles V.

== Description ==
Suleiman was born in captivity in the royal stables of Sinhalese King Bhuvanekabahu VII (r. 1521–1551) of the Kingdom of Kotte in modern (Ceylon), who was a close ally of the Portuguese who landed on the island in 1505 or 1506. Suleiman came as a small baby bull elephant to Lisbon with the entourage of the Kotte Ambassador Sri Ramaraska Pandita, who had been sent to Portugal on a special diplomatic mission in 1542: the mission is seen as a duplication of the Sinhalese embassy to Europe from King Bhathikabhaya of Anuradapura to the Roman emperor Claudius where Pliny describes how the inhabitants of the west coast kingdom's delighted in the elephant and the tiger c 47 CE. The elephant was seen as both a diplomatic and auspicious gift for the Portuguese monarchs, John III and Catherine.

Before Suleiman was presented to Maximilian II, he was intended for John III's grandson, Don Carlos, Prince of Asturias (1545–1568), eldest son of Philip II of Spain. The elephant traveled by foot with a Portuguese retinue from Lisbon, arriving in Aranda de Duero (Burgos, Spain) before November 6, 1549. When the care and maintenance of this pachyderm proved too expensive and complicated, the elephant was adopted by Maximilian II, who was recently married to Philip II's sister, Maria of Austria, in 1548. Maximilian and Maria acted as Regents of Spain from 1548 to 1551, in the absence of Emperor Charles V and Philip II, who was on an extended visit of the Netherlands (1549–1551). Known in German as "Soliman", he was named after the Ottoman Sultan, Suleiman the Magnificent.

Suleiman was transported from the Portuguese colonies Kotte in Ceylon (Sri Lanka) and Goa in India to Lisbon, and then to Valladolid, then the capital of Spain. Accompanied by Maximilian, his wife and their two children, and their attendants, Suleiman was shipped from Barcelona to Genoa, where he arrived on 12 November 1551, and then traveled overland via Milan, Cremona and Mantua. He reached Trent, where the Council of Trent had just finished meeting, on 13 December. He crossed over the Brenner Pass to enter Austria, where he was transported along the River Inn and Danube to Vienna. He reached Innsbruck on 6 January for the feast of the Epiphany, and Wasserburg on 24 January 1552. The procession entered Vienna on 6 March 1552. A wave of "elephant enthusiasms" followed, and Suleiman was a popular subject for artists and poets. Suleiman was installed in the menagerie at Schloss Kaiserebersdorf 8 km (5.0 mi) south-east of Vienna, but died only 18 months later, in December 1553.

== Death ==
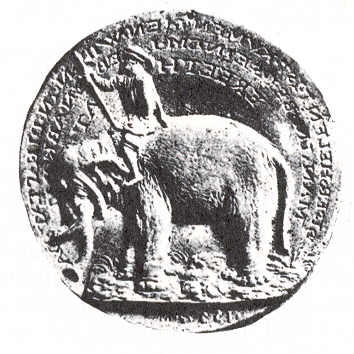
Medallion of Suleiman by Michael Fuchs, 1554. Inscription: DIESER HELFANT IST KVMEN GIEN WIEN IN DIE STAT / DA MAN IN BEI SEINEM LEBEN ABKONTERFET HAT ("This elephant came to the city of Vienna, where it was portrayed from life")

Maximillian had a commemorative medallion issued after Suleiman's death to a design by sculptor Michael Fuchs. Parts of Suleiman's carcass were distributed around the Holy Roman Empire. His front right foot and part of a shoulderblade were given to the mayor of Vienna, Sebastian Huetstocker; the bones were fashioned into a chair that currently resides at the Kremsmünster Abbey. The elephant's skin was stuffed and exhibited in Kaiserebersdorf until Maximillian, as Emperor, presented it as a gift to Albert V, Duke of Bavaria, in 1572. The stuffed pachyderm survived for centuries in the Wittlesbach royal collections and Kunstkammer in the Munich Residenz.

After standing more than 100 years in the Bavarian National Museum in Munich, the stuffed Suleiman was transferred to the Bavarian National Museum in 1928. Stored in a cellar, the historic stuffed pachyderm survived World War II bombing raids on Munich in 1943, only to be sold after the war for shoe leather. Because of dampness in storage, his skin had mildewed.

== See also ==
- History of elephants in Europe
- List of individual elephants
- The Elephant's Journey, José Saramago's 2008 historical novel based on this elephant's journey from Lisbon to Vienna
