= The Elephant's Journey =

2008 novel by José Saramago

- First edition
- Author: José Saramago
- Original title: A Viagem do Elefante
- Translator: Margaret Jull Costa
- Language: Portuguese
- Publisher: Caminho
- Publication date: 2008
- Publication place: Portugal
- English publication date: 2010
- Pages: 285
- ISBN: 978-0547574110

The Elephant's Journey (Portuguese: A Viagem do Elefante) is a novel by Nobel Prize-winning author José Saramago. It was first published in 2008 with an English translation in 2010.

== Plot ==
In 1551, King João III of Portugal gave Archduke Maximilian an unusual wedding present: an elephant named Solomon or Suleiman. This elephant's journey from Lisbon to Vienna was witnessed and remarked upon by scholars, historians, and ordinary people. Out of this material, José Saramago has spun a novel already heralded as "a triumph of language, imagination, and humor" (El País).

Solomon and his keeper, Subhro, begin in dismal conditions, forgotten in a corner of the palace grounds. When it occurs to the king and queen that an elephant would be an appropriate wedding gift, everyone rushes to get them ready: Subhro is given two new suits of clothes and Solomon a long overdue scrub. They cross the border into Spain at Castelo Rodrigo and meet the Archduke at Valladolid.

Accompanied by the Archduke, his new wife, the royal guard, Solomon and Subhro cross a continent riven by the Reformation and civil wars. They make their way through the storied cities of northern Italy: Genoa, Piacenza, Mantua, Verona, Venice, and Trento, where the Council of Trent is in session. They brave the Alps and the terrifying Isarco and Brenner Passes; they sail from Rosas across the Mediterranean Sea and later up the Inn River (elephants, it turns out, are natural sailors). At last they make their grand entry into the imperial city. The Elephant's Journey is a tale of friendship and adventure.

== Topics ==
Saramago shows the sentimental side of all people and animals, regardless of their social status. The characters are thus full of different nuances, such as the ignorance of kings, the convenient flexibility of a cleric in the middle of the night, the intelligence of a mahout to sell elephant hair to alleviate any evil.

== Editions ==
The novel was translated into English by Margaret Jull Costa and published in 2010.

== Awards and recognitions ==
- 2009 São Paulo Prize for Literature — Shortlisted in the Best Book of the Year category (Portuguese original)
- 2011 Oxford-Weidenfeld Translation Prize — Winner (English translation).
