= Hansken =

Female elephant that became famous in 17th-century Europe

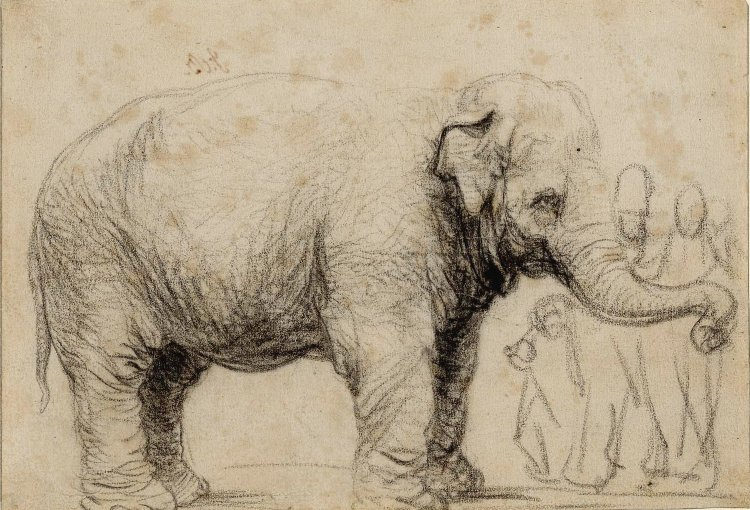
Rembrandt: A sketch of Hansken, 1637.

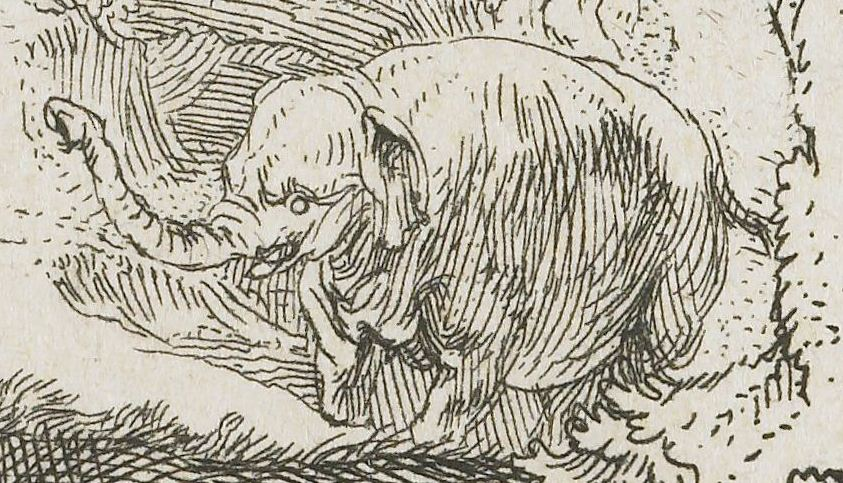
Rembrandt van Rijn: Hansken, detail of the etching Adam and Eve (1638), Rijksmuseum Amsterdam.

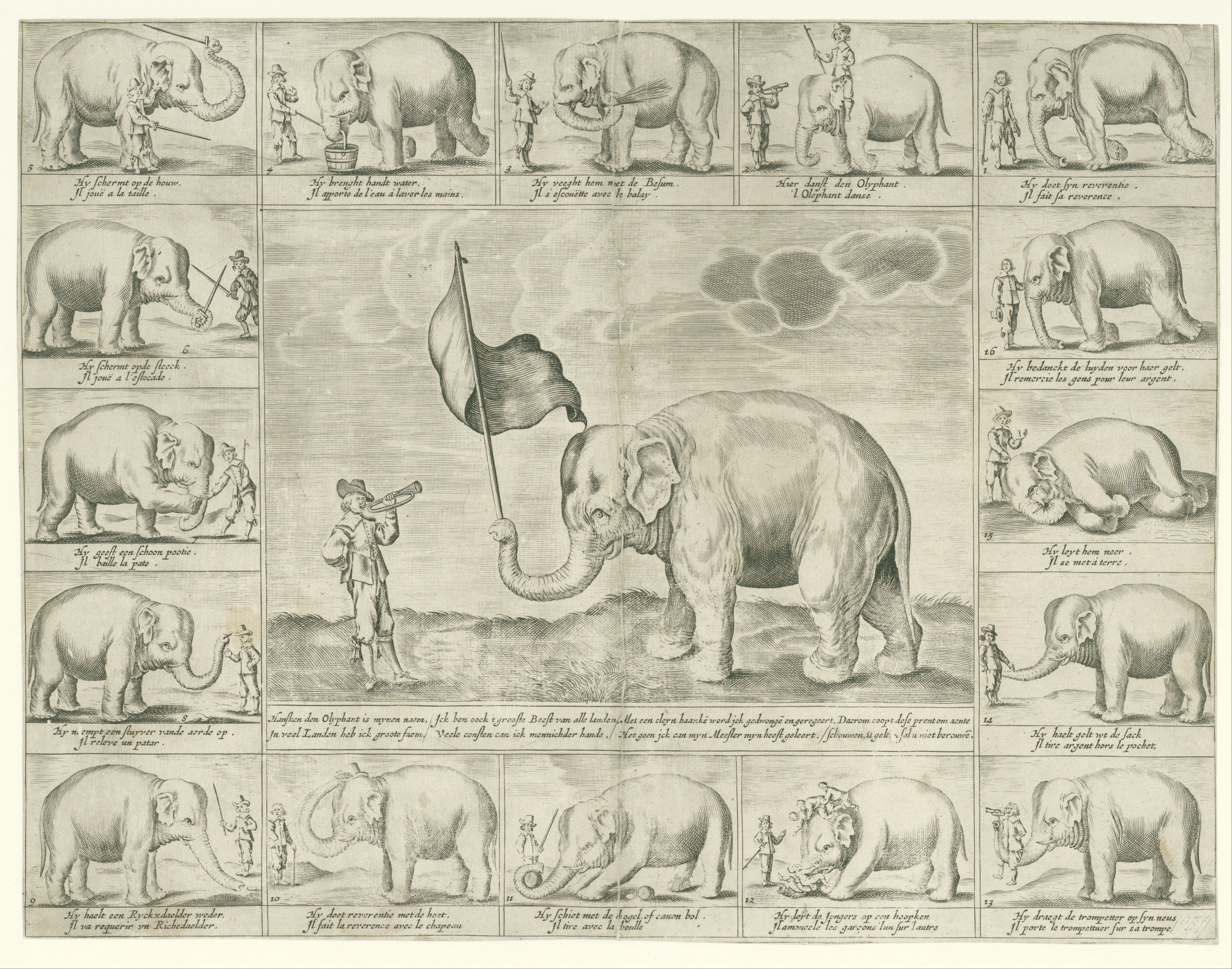
Anonymous 17th century copperplate showing the tricks performed by Hansken in 1641, sold as a contemporary souvenir. Around 1650.

Hansken (1630 – 9 November 1655 in Florence) was a female Sri Lankan elephant that became famous in early 17th-century Europe. She toured many countries, demonstrating circus tricks, and influenced many artists including Stefano della Bella, Theodoor van Thulden and notably, Rembrandt.

Hansken was born in what was then Ceylon and was brought to Holland in 1637 at the request of Prince Frederick Henry. She was purchased by Cornelis van Groenevelt for 20,000 guilders, who transported her around Europe on tour. Her name is a Dutch diminutive form of the Tamil word aanai, meaning "elephant". Rembrandt saw her in Amsterdam in 1637, and made four sketches of her in chalk.

Hansken toured fairs in the Netherlands and Germany. She appeared in Hamburg in 1638, in Bremen in 1640, in Rotterdam in 1641, in Frankfurt in 1646 and 1647, and in Lüneburg in 1650. She was likely in Leipzig in 1649 and 1651.

In the 17th century, it was believed that elephants had very advanced intellectual abilities. Following Pliny, it was thought that the elephant was the nearest to man in intelligence, and that elephants could understand speech, follow orders, and had a sense of religion and conscience. Pliny even reports that an elephant had learned to write words in the Greek alphabet. Hansken did not live up to these expectations, but she could wave a flag, fire a pistol, strike a drum, hold out her front feet, pinch money from pockets, put on a hat, carry a bucket of water, and pick up coins from the ground.

In July 1651, Hansken travelled to Zürich, Solothurn, Bregenz and St. Gallen, and on to Rome. She visited Florence, where she was drawn by artist Stefano della Bella. On the way back from Rome, the elephant died in the Piazza della Signoria, Florence. Della Bella also drew her corpse after her death on 9 November 1655.

The skeleton of Hansken is still preserved in Florence at Museo della Specola, and was described by the naturalist John Ray in 1693. Ray's description of the skeleton was extensively utilized by Carl Linnaeus when he scientifically described and named the Asian elephant species, Elephas maximus, in 1758 in the 10th edition of Systema Naturae. In 2014, The skeleton of Hansken was declared to be the lectotype specimen on which the Asian elephant species is based. The skin, which was mounted on a wooden support, is now lost.

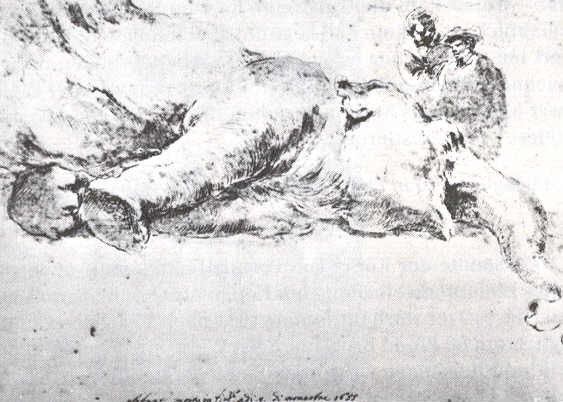
Stefano della Bella's drawing of Hansken after her death (1655)

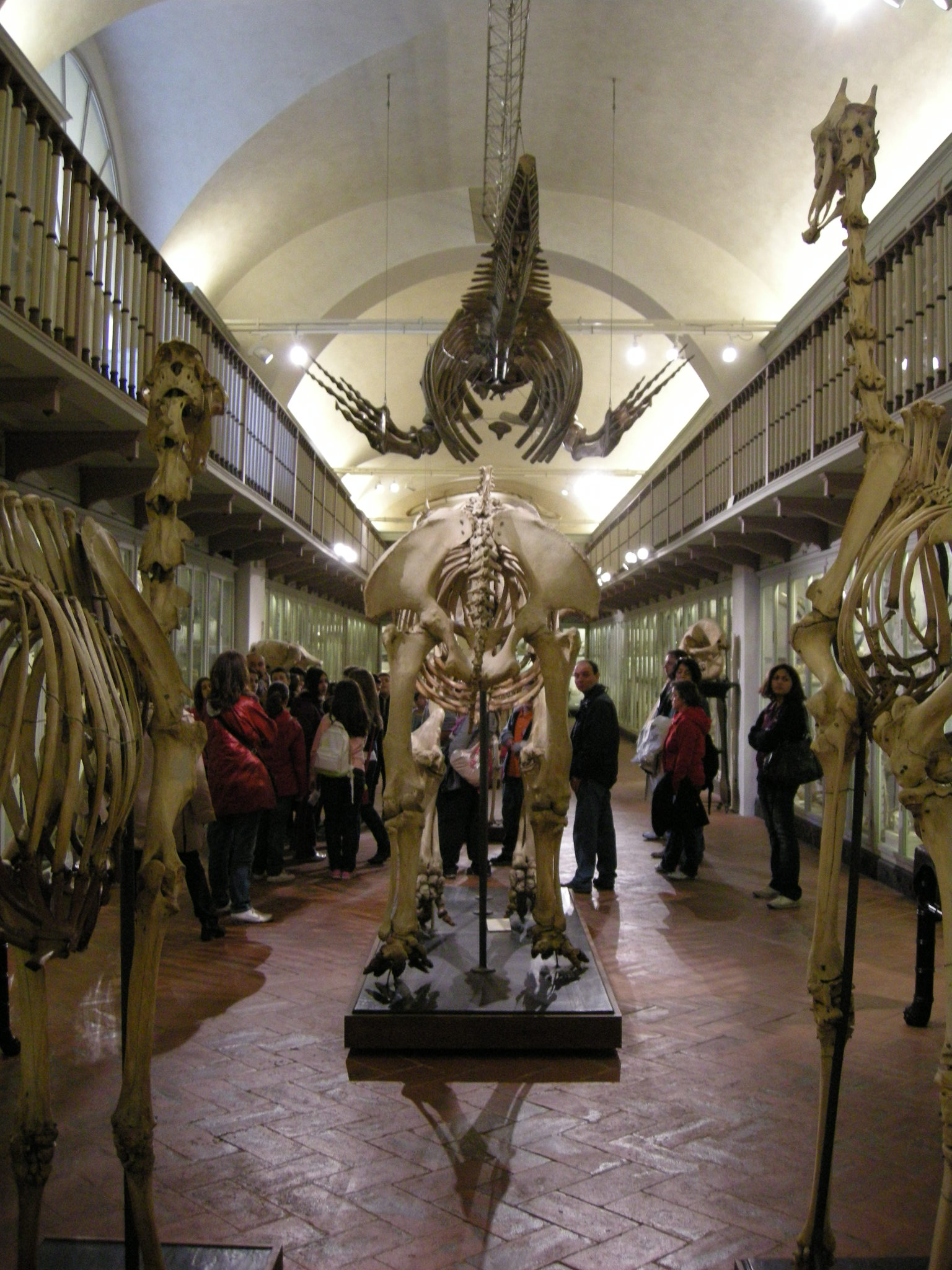
Hansken's skeleton in Florence (seen from behind, in the center of the image)

== See also ==
- Cultural depictions of elephants
- List of individual elephants
- History of elephants in Europe
- Hanno (elephant)
