= Ferdinand, Prince of Asturias =

Ferdinand
- Prince of Asturias
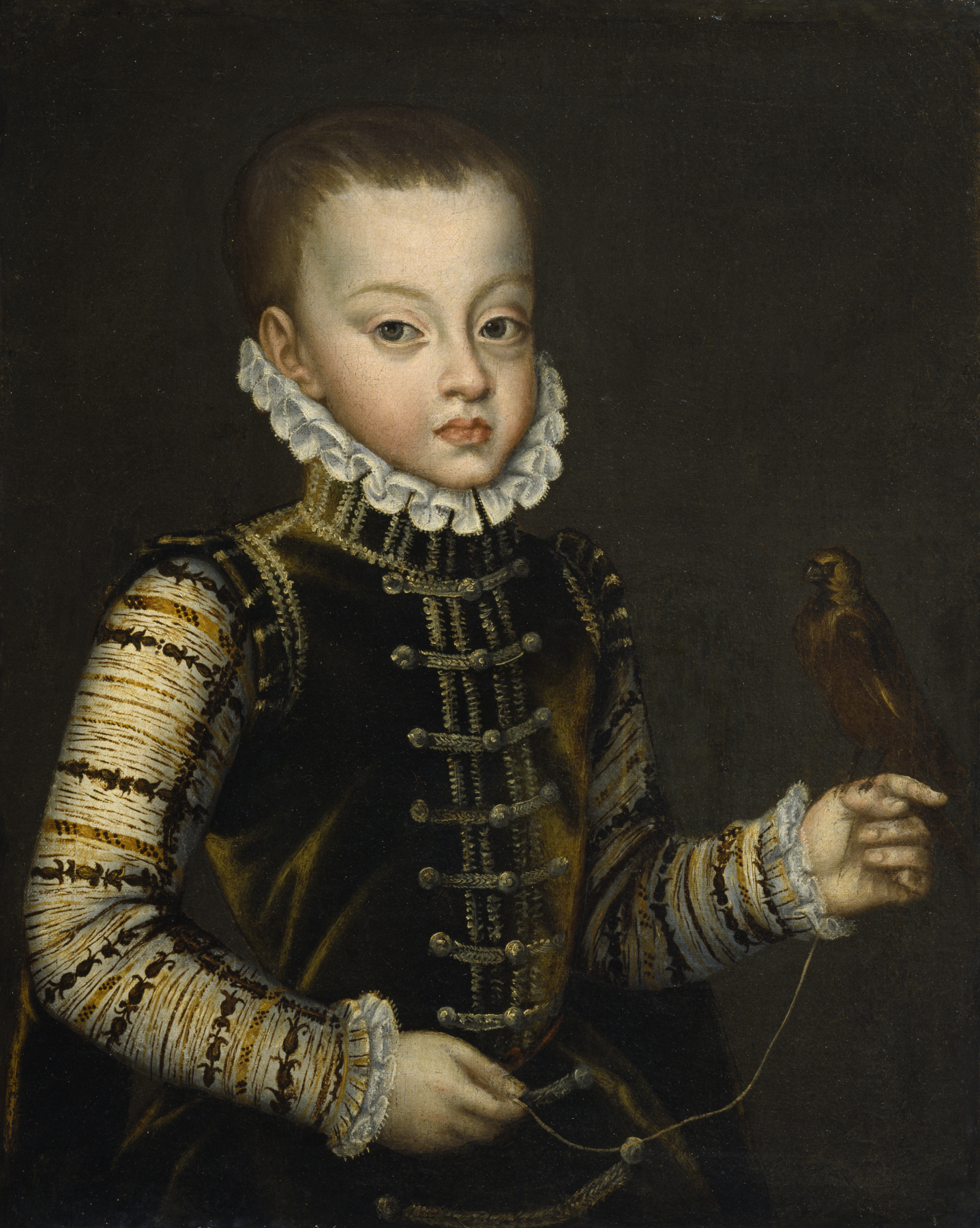
- Portrait by Sánchez Coello, c. 1575
- Born: 4 December 1571; Madrid, Crown of Castile, Spain
- Died: 18 October 1578 (aged 6); Madrid, Crown of Castile, Spain
- Burial: El Escorial
- House: Habsburg
- Father: Philip II of Spain
- Mother: Anna of Austria

Ferdinand, Prince of Asturias (4 December 1571 – 18 October 1578) was a member of the House of Habsburg who was heir apparent to the Spanish throne.

== Biography ==
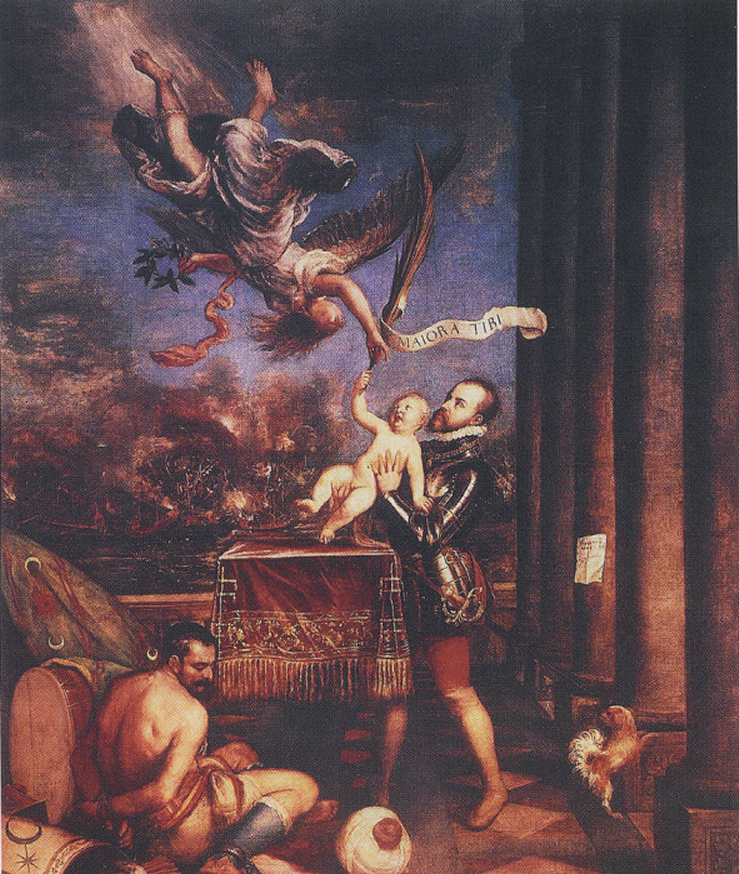
Painting by Titian of Ferdinand's father offering him to victory

Born on 4 December 1571 at the Royal Alcázar of Madrid, Ferdinand was the eldest child of Philip II and Anne of Austria. His mother was Philip II's niece and fourth wife. His elder half-brother, Don Carlos, had died in 1568, which meant that he was the new heir apparent at birth and therefore Prince of Asturias. To thank God for the birth of the long-awaited son, prisoners were released – as commemorated in Titian's painting, Philip II Offering Don Fernando to Victory.

Most of his time was spent with his mother, his nurses and his two elder half-sisters Catherine and Isabella.

On 31 May 1573, Ferdinand was officially made Prince of Asturias at San Jerónimo el Real.

Ferdinand died of dysentery on 18 October 1578. His father was eventually succeeded by his youngest brother, Philip III of Spain.

Spanish royalty
Preceded by Charles	Prince of Asturias; 1571–1578	Succeeded by Diego
