= Hanno (elephant) =

Pet elephant of Pope Leo X

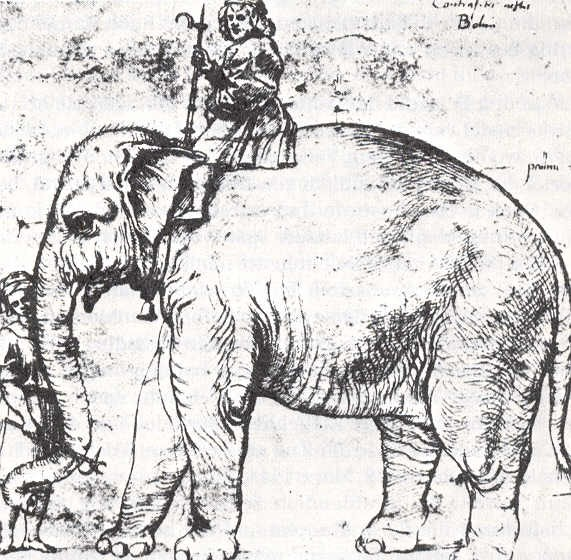
Sketch of Hanno and mahout, by Raphael, c.1514.

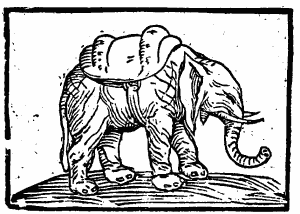
Woodcut of Hanno on pamphlet by Philomathes (Rome, c. 1514)

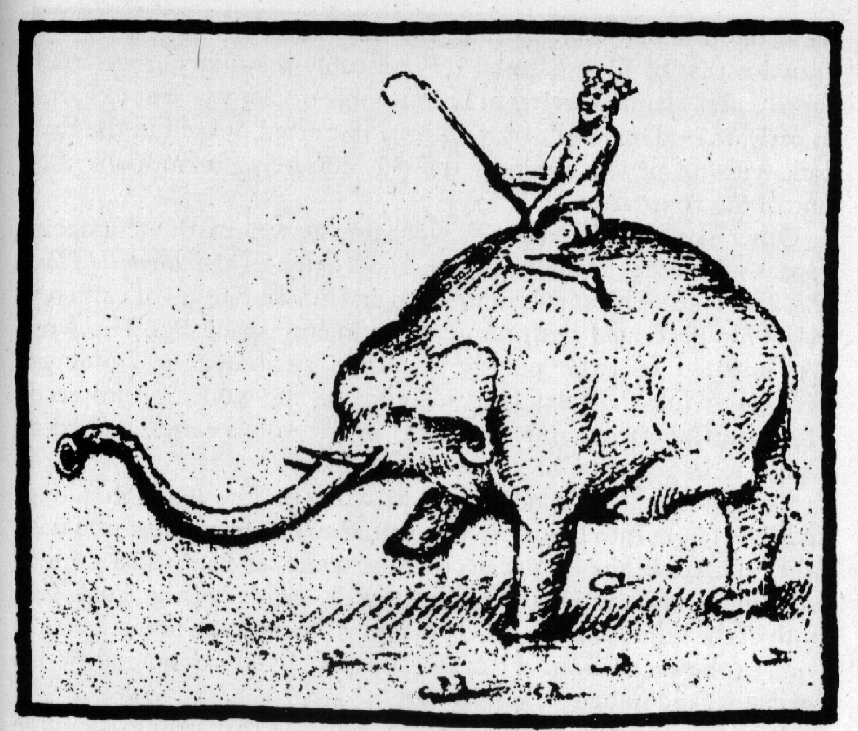
Sketch of Hanno, the elephant offered to the Pope by Manuel I of Portugal, from title page of Leitura Nova.

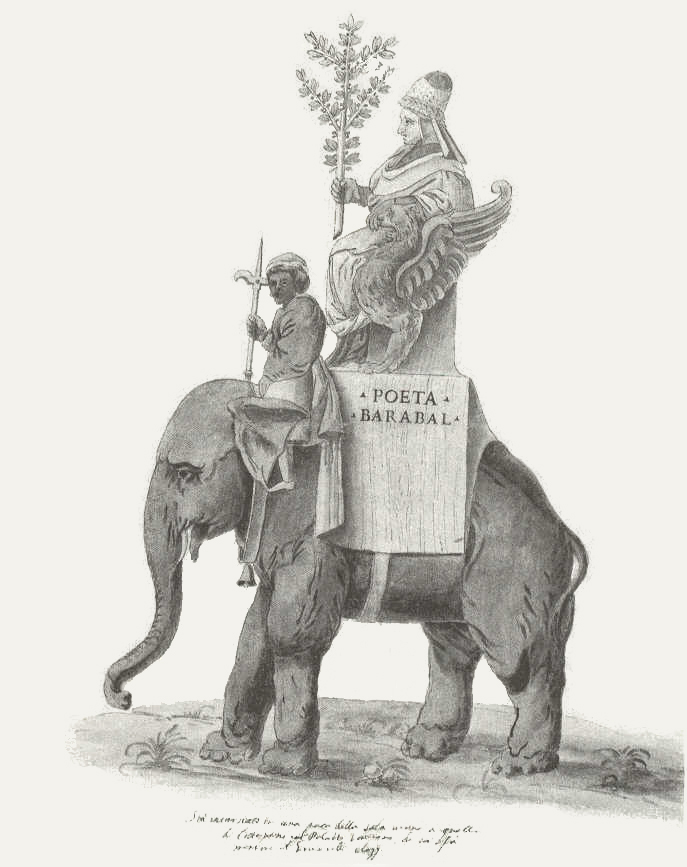
Baraballo and Hanno, Vatican Apostolic Library

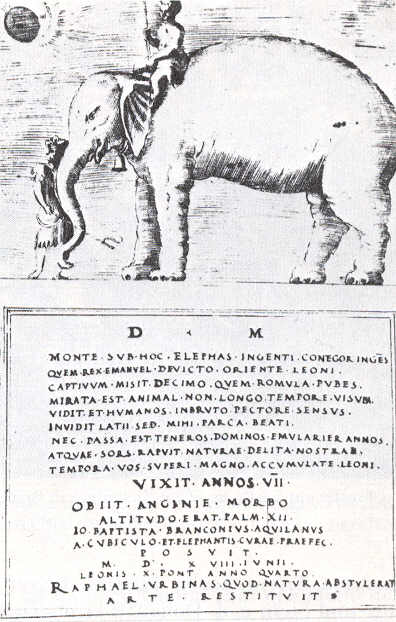
Sketch of Hanno's memorial fresco and epitaph.

Hanno (Italian: Annone; c. 1510 – 8 June 1516) was the pet white elephant given by King Manuel I of Portugal to Pope Leo X (born Giovanni de' Medici) at his coronation. He was named Annon and Hanno after the Malayalam word Aana (ആന) meaning elephant. Hanno, an Asian elephant, came to Rome in 1514 with the Portuguese ambassador Tristão da Cunha and quickly became the Pope's favorite animal. Hanno died two years later from complications of a treatment for constipation with gold-enriched laxative.

== Background ==
King Manuel had either received him as a gift from the Raja of Cochin, or had asked Afonso de Albuquerque, his viceroy in India, to purchase him. Hanno was said to be white in colour, and arrived by ship from Lisbon to Rome in 1514, aged about four years, and was kept initially in an enclosure in the Belvedere courtyard, then moved to a specially constructed building between St. Peter's Basilica and the Apostolic Palace, near the Borgo Sant'Angelo (a road in the rione of Borgo). His arrival was commemorated in poetry and art. Pasquale Malaspina wrote:

In the Belvedere before the great Pastor

Was conducted the trained elephant
Dancing with such grace and such love
That hardly better would a man have danced:
And then with its trunk such a great noise
It made, that the entire place was deafened:
And stretching itself on the ground to kneel
It then straightened up in reverence to the Pope,

And to his entourage.

=== Hanno and the Pope ===
Keeping exotic animals in menageries was nothing unusual at European courts. Pope Leo X. was used to rare animals due to his father, Lorenzo de' Medici, having a famous enclosure in Florence. He himself had a small zoo in the Vatican, consisting of a bear, two trained leopards and a chameleon.

The pope liked his elephant, which was confirmed by visitors of the papal menagerie. They were allowed to visit on Sundays and could observe Leo X. playing with his pet in a dedicated but clumsy manner. When Lorenzo di Piero de’ Medici, the pope’s nephew, asked to borrow Hanno in 1514 for an event in Florence the pope denied his request. He was afraid the long journey would be too much for the large mammal. Specifically, the feet worried the holy father, making him even consider constructing unique footwear to protect the elephant. But even with that he was not willing to lend his pet.

There is evidence of a procession for Baraballo, the poet and jester of the Vatican. Giacomo Barabello, abbot of Gaeta, was a prominent figure at pope Leo’s diverse court. His artistic improvisations often referring to Petrarch have caused great amusement among the pope and his guests because of their involuntary humorous nature. As a further point of entertainment he was rewarded for his efforts, often in an exaggerated way. One such occasion unfolded when Barabello travelled to Rome to be crowned as poet laureate, because he saw himself as an equal to Petrarch. The pope awarded him the title on 27 September 1514 and paraded him around on Hanno afterwards. Initially the elephant endured the ceremony but with more and more people attending the increasing noise made him nervous. He threw Baraballo off his back, creating a lasting memory for the attendees. The poet soon after died, but it is unclear if the incident played a role in that.

On Hanno’s next mission he was involved in a fatal accident. Giuliano de' Medici married Filiberta of Savoy on 25 January 1515. The pair travelled to Rome in March expecting a celebratory reception. Part of that reception was Hanno, who carried a tower with armed men on it. They were part of a noble entourage that was sent towards Giuliano. The gun salute and the uproar of the crowd caused the elephant to panic. He tried to flee, wreaking havoc and causing the tower on his back to fall into the Tiber. The commotion led to the death of thirteen people according to an official report.

Two years after he came to Rome, he fell ill suddenly, was given a purgative, and died on 8 June 1516 with the pope by his side. Hanno was interred in the Cortile del Belvedere at the age of seven.

The artist Raphael designed a memorial fresco (which does not survive), and the Pope himself composed the epitaph:

Under this great hill I lie buried

Mighty elephant which the King Manuel
Having conquered the Orient
Sent as captive to Pope Leo X.
At which the Roman people marvelled,
A beast not seen for a long time,
And in my brutish breast they perceived human feelings.
Fate envied me my residence in the blessed Latium
And had not the patience to let me serve my master a full three years.
But I wish, oh gods, that the time which Nature would have assigned to me,
and Destiny stole away,
You will add to the life of the great Leo.

He lived for seven years
He died of angina
He measured twelve palms in height.
Giovanni Battista Branconio dell'Aquila
Privy chamberlain to the pope
And provost of the custody of the elephant,
Has erected this in 1516, the 8th of June,
In the fourth year of the pontificate of Leo X.

That which Nature has stolen away

Raphael of Urbino with his art has restored.

Hanno was also the subject of a satirical pamphlet by Pietro Aretino titled "The Last Will and Testament of the Elephant Hanno." The fictitious will cleverly mocked the leading political and religious figures of Rome at the time, including Pope Leo X himself. The pamphlet was such a success that it kickstarted Aretino's career and established him as a famous satirist, ultimately known as "the Scourge of Princes".

There are four sketches of Hanno, done in life with red chalk, in the collection of the Ashmolean Museum at Oxford.

== In popular culture ==
Hanno's story is told at length in Silvio Bedini's book, The Pope's Elephant. According to Robert Greene, Aretino's audacious satire catapulted him to fame and, such was Leo's amusement, earned him a post in the papal service.

The Malayalam novel "Aano" Written by G. R. Indugopan is the story of this elephant and its mahout who travelled in Europe as their perspective

== See also ==
- List of individual elephants
- History of elephants in Europe
- Hansken
- Abul-Abbas
- Dürer's Rhinoceros
