= Archduchess Margaret of Austria (1567–1633) =

Austrian archduchess and nun

Archduchess Margaret
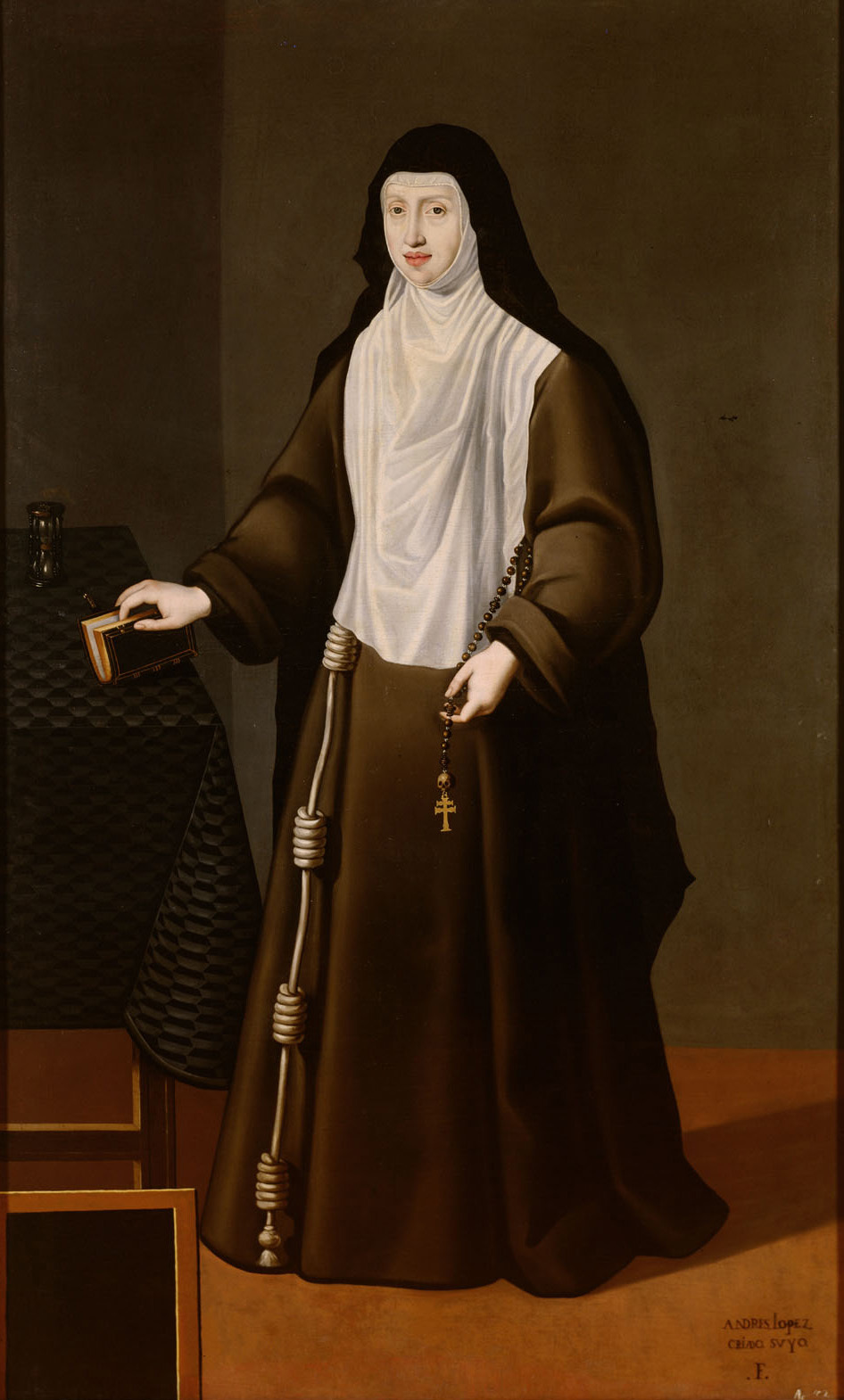
- Margaret as a nun by Andrés López Polanco, c. 1610
- Born: 25 January 1567; Wiener Neustadt, Archduchy of Austria, Holy Roman Empire
- Died: 5 July 1633 (aged 66); Madrid, Crown of Castile
- House: Habsburg
- Father: Maximilian II, Holy Roman Emperor
- Mother: Maria of Spain
- Religion: Roman Catholicism

Archduchess Margaret of Austria (25 January 1567 – 5 July 1633), was an Austrian archduchess of the House of Habsburg.

She was the daughter of Maximilian II, Holy Roman Emperor by his wife Maria of Spain, daughter of Charles V, Holy Roman Emperor by his wife Isabella of Portugal.

== Life ==
Born in Wiener Neustadt, Margaret was the fifteenth child and fifth daughter of her parents' sixteen children, of whom eight survived infancy. From early childhood, she was deeply influenced by her mother's strict Catholicism. In 1582, Empress Maria returned to her homeland Spain permanently, taking her youngest surviving child Margaret with her, promised to marry Philip II of Spain, who had lost his fourth wife, her sister, Anna of Austria, in 1580.Margaret was about to become the fifth wife of her uncle, King Philip II of Spain, whom she rejected saying: "How can I marry a king of the earth if I have already been asked for by a greater lord, the king of Heaven."

=== Life as a nun ===
Margaret refused marriage to Philip II and took the veil under the name of Sor Margaret of the Cross as a Poor Clare nun in the Monastery of Santa Clara de las Descalzas Reales in Madrid.

Margaret asked her nephew, Philip III, to bring her first cousin-twice-removed, Catherine of East, to the convent to ensure her education and a certain dynastic continuity in the convent, although she died prematurely in 1628, before taking her vows. Margaret also asked the king to bring another niece, Anna Dorothea, daughter of Rudolf II, with the same intention, the girl arriving at the convent in 1621. Later she professed under the name of Sor Anne Dorotea of the Conception and managed to ensure the presence of the House of Austria in the convent through the education and subsequent profession of her great-grandniece Mariana and her great-great-grandniece Margaret of Austria, the latter choosing the name Sor Margaret in memory of her aunt.

Her mother was also resident in the convent until her death in 1603. Margaret was the dedicatee of the first published edition of the requiem which was composed for her mother's funeral by the composer and priest Tomás Luis de Victoria. Margaret died, aged 66, and was buried in her convent.

== Ancestry ==
Ancestors of Archduchess Margaret of Austria (1567–1633)

8. Philip I, King of Castile
4. Ferdinand I, Holy Roman Emperor
9. Joanna, Queen of Castile
2. Maximilian II, Holy Roman Emperor
10. Vladislas II, King of Bohemia and Hungary
5. Anne of Bohemia and Hungary
11. Anne of Foix-Candale
1. Archduchess Margaret of Austria
12. Philip I, King of Castile (= 8)
6. Charles V, Holy Roman Emperor
13. Joanna, Queen of Castile (= 9)
3. Maria of Austria
14. Manuel I, King of Portugal
7. Isabella of Portugal
15. Maria of Aragon
