= Cremona elephant =

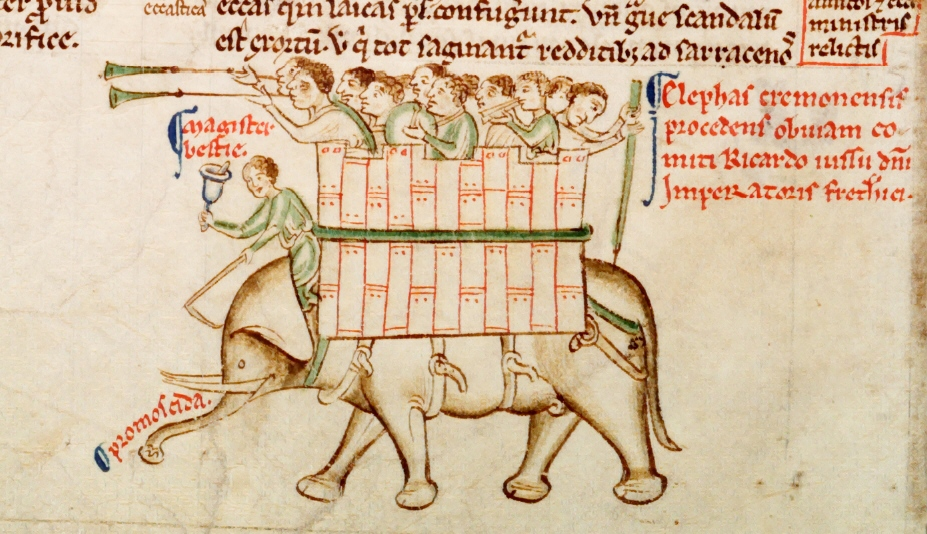
The Cremona elephant as depicted in the Chronica maiora, Part II, Parker Library, MS 16, fol. 152v

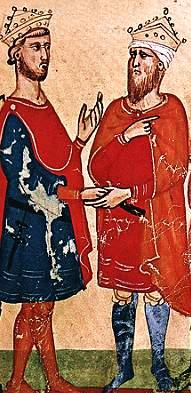
Frederick II (left) meets al-Kamil (right).

The Cremona elephant was a gift presented to Holy Roman Emperor Frederick II by Sultan of Egypt Al-Kamil, in 1229. Frederick used the elephant in his triumph parades.

The elephant is mentioned in the context of the visit of Frederick's brother-in-law Richard of Cornwall to Cremona in 1241, in the Chronica Maiora of Matthew Paris. The presence of the animal is also recorded in the Cremona city annals, in 1237.

This elephant was the first of its species reported from first-hand experience by European sources since the days of Abul Abbas owned by Charlemagne. Another 13th-century individual was owned by Louis IX (attested for 1255).

== Use in Battle ==
Miniature of a war elephant, dating back to the 1230s Although Salimbene himself claims that Frederick regularly used the elephant in battle alongside his numerous Saracen forces, we have no evidence that the pachyderm took part in any battles. The Cremona elephant was probably only used for celebratory events, or at most as a working animal. The Parma historian's erroneous conclusion may have stemmed from the fact that, since elephants were present in cities near which fighting took place, it was believed at the time that they must have been a fighting beast.

Furthermore, the actual warfare capacity of war elephants and, therefore, their actual use remain a subject of debate even today: although almost unstoppable against infantry, elephants were extremely vulnerable to siege engines and missiles. Their presence was not always advantageous: if the animals panicked, they could start to flee towards the rear of their "own" army, trampling anyone in their path and causing numerous casualties. Nevertheless, the psychological impact these animals had on their opponents should not be underestimated, as the sight of a war elephant could instill confusion, fear and disarray among European armies.

== See also ==
- History of elephants in Europe
- List of individual elephants
