= Silvio Bedini =

American historian (1917–2007)

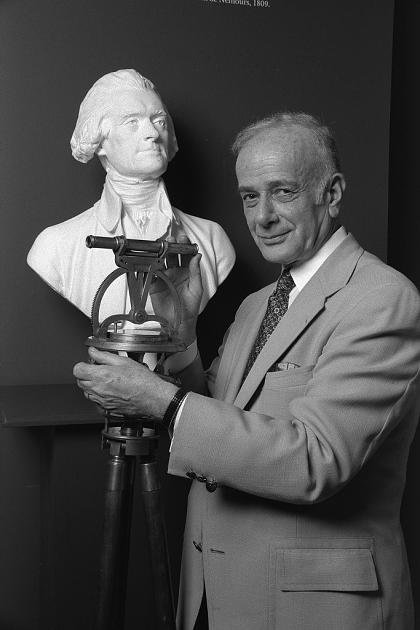
- Born: January 17, 1917; Ridgefield, Connecticut, U.S.
- Died: November 14, 2007 (aged 90)
- Education: Columbia University
- Awards: Abbott Payson Award (1962); Paul-Bunge-Preis (1997); Leonardo da Vinci Medal (2000)
- Scientific career
- Fields: History
- Workplaces: Smithsonian Institution; National Museum of American History; Society for the History of Technology; American Philosophical Society; American Antiquarian Society; Society of American Historians; Washington Academy of Sciences

Silvio Anthony Bedini (January 17, 1917 – November 14, 2007) was an American historian, specialising in early scientific instruments. He was Historian Emeritus of the Smithsonian Institution, where he served on the professional staff for twenty-five years, retiring in 1987.

== Biography ==
Bedini was born in Ridgefield, Connecticut, in 1917.

In 1958 he accepted an invitation to write a brochure about the history of his hometown for its 250th anniversary, a project that just three months later resulted in a 411-page book titled Ridgefield in Review.

In 1961 he accepted the offer of a position in Washington, D.C., as curator in the Department of Mechanical and Civil Engineering at the Smithsonian Institution in the new Museum of History and Technology (now the National Museum of American History), which was under construction. By 1965, Bedini became assistant director of the Museum of History and Technology, and in 1972 was appointed deputy director of the National Museum of History and Technology. Following his tenure as deputy director, he served as Keeper of Rare Books at the Dibner Library of the History of Science and Technology, a branch of the Smithsonian Institution Libraries, from 1978 until his retirement in 1987. Afterwards, Bedini served as Historian Emeritus at the Smithsonian.

== Awards ==
For his research and publications in 1962 Bedini received the Abbott Payson Award of the Society for the History of Technology, and in 1997 in Darmstadt, Germany he was awarded the Paul-Bunge-Preis at the General Assembly of the German Bunsen Society for Physical Chemistry "for the book of foremost quality on the history of scientific instruments."

In 2000, in Munich, Germany he was awarded the Leonardo da Vinci Medal, "the highest recognition from the Society of the History of Technology."

== Memberships ==
His memberships include the American Philosophical Society, the American Antiquarian Society, the Society of American Historians, the Washington Academy of Sciences, the Scientific Instrument Society (London), the Astrolabe Society (Paris), the Surveyors Historical Society, and most recently, the DC Association of Land Surveyors, which extended to him an Honorary Membership in December 2003.

Bedini was completing his twenty-third book.

== Works ==
- "Johann Philipp Trefler: Clockmaker of Augsburg", Bulletin of the National Association of Watch and Clock Collectors (1956–1957), reprinted as pamphlet. (1957).
- Ridgefield in Review. (1958).
- Agent for the Archduke: Another chapter in the story of Johann Phillip Treffler, Clockmaker of Augsburg. (1961).
- XIVth and XVth century public clocks of the papal marches. (1962).
- Galileo Galilei and time measurement: A re-examination of pertinent documents. (1963).
- "The scent of time: A study of the use of fire and incense for time measurement in Oriental countries" (Transactions of the American Philosophical Society, new ser). (1963).
- "Early American Scientific Instruments and Their Makers". United States National Museum Bulletin. (1964).
- The makers of Galileo's scientific instruments. (1964).
- "The Borghesi Astronomical Clock in the Museum of History and Technology" (United States National Museum Bulletin). (1966).
- "Mechanical Universe. The Astrarium of Giovanni de Dondi" (Transactions of the American Philosophical Society, New Series, Volume 56, Part 5.). (1966).
- Sundials and dialling: A bibliography of Italian and other references. (1966).
- Seventeenth century magnetic timepieces. (1969).
- "Benjamin Banneker and the survey of the District of Columbia, 1791". (Records of the Columbia Historical Society) (1971).
- The tube of long vision : (the physical characteristics of the early 17th Century telescope). (1971).
- The Life of Benjamin Banneker. (1971).
- Moon Man's Greatest Adventure (with Wernher von; Whipple, Fred L. and Thomas, Davis Braun. (1973).
- Thinkers and tinkers: Early American men of science. (1975).
- The Spotted Stones. (Library Binding – 1978).
- Introduction—the Vatican's astronomical paintings and the Institute of the Sciences of Bologna. (1980).
- Thinkers and Tinkers: Early American Men of Science. (1980).
- Th. Jefferson and science: Exhibition catalogue. (1981).
- Declaration of Independence Desk, Relic of Revolution. (1981).
- Thinkers and Tinkers: Early Men of Science. (1983).
- "At the Sign of the Compass and Quadrant: The Life and Times of Anthony Lamb" (Transactions of the American Philosophical Society). (1984).
- "The scientific instruments of the Lewis and Clark expedition", Great Plains Quarterly. (1984).
- Thomas Jefferson and His Copying Machines (Monticello monograph series). (1984)
- Clockwork cosmos: Bernardo Facini and the Farnese planisferologio (Studi e testi). (1985).
- Thomas Jefferson and American vertebrate paleontology (Virginia Division of Mineral Resources publication). (1985).
- Marshall's meridian instrument. (1987).
- Thomas Jefferson: Statesman of Science. (1990).
- The Christopher Columbus Encyclopedia. (1991).
- The pulse of time : Galileo Galilei, the determination of longitude, and the pendulum clock. (1991).
- "The Survey of the Federal Territory: Andrew Ellicott and Benjamin Banneker" (Washington History). (1991).
- Science and Instruments in Seventeenth-Century Italy (Collected Studies Series, Cs448). (1994).
- The Trail of Time : Time Measurement with Incense in East Asia, Cambridge University Press. (1994). ISBN 0-521-37482-0
- Banneker, Benjamin (Encyclopedia of African-American History and Culture). (1996).
- "The Mace and the Gavel: Symbols of Government in America" (Transactions of the American Philosophical Society). (1997).
- Pope's Elephant: An Elephant's Journey from Deep in India to the Heart of Rome. (1997).
- Christopher Columbus and the Age of Exploration: An Encyclopedia, (with David Buisseret). (1998).
- Maryland Historical Magazine – Summer 1998 (Vol. 93 No. 2) (with Michael P. McCarthy, Merle T. Cole and Karen Robbins). (1998).
- The Pope's Elephant, Nashville, TN: J.S. Sanders & Co. (1998).
- The Jefferson Stone: Demarcation of the First Meridian of the United States. (1999).
- Patrons, Artisans and Instruments of Science, 1600–1750, (Collected Studies, Cs635). (1999)
- The Life of Benjamin Banneker: The First African-American Man of Science. (1999)
- "Banneker, Benjamin (1731–1806), farmer and astronomer" (American National Biography). (1999)
- William Churton (fl. 1749-1767): North Carolina Cartographer (Professional surveyor). (2001).
- With Compass and Chain: Early American Surveyors and Their Instruments. (2001).
- Jefferson and Science (with Donald Fleming). (2002).
- "Benjamin Banneker" (Complete Dictionary of Scientific Biography). (2008).
