= Anna of Austria, Queen of Spain =

Queen of Spain from 1570 to 1580

Anna of Austria
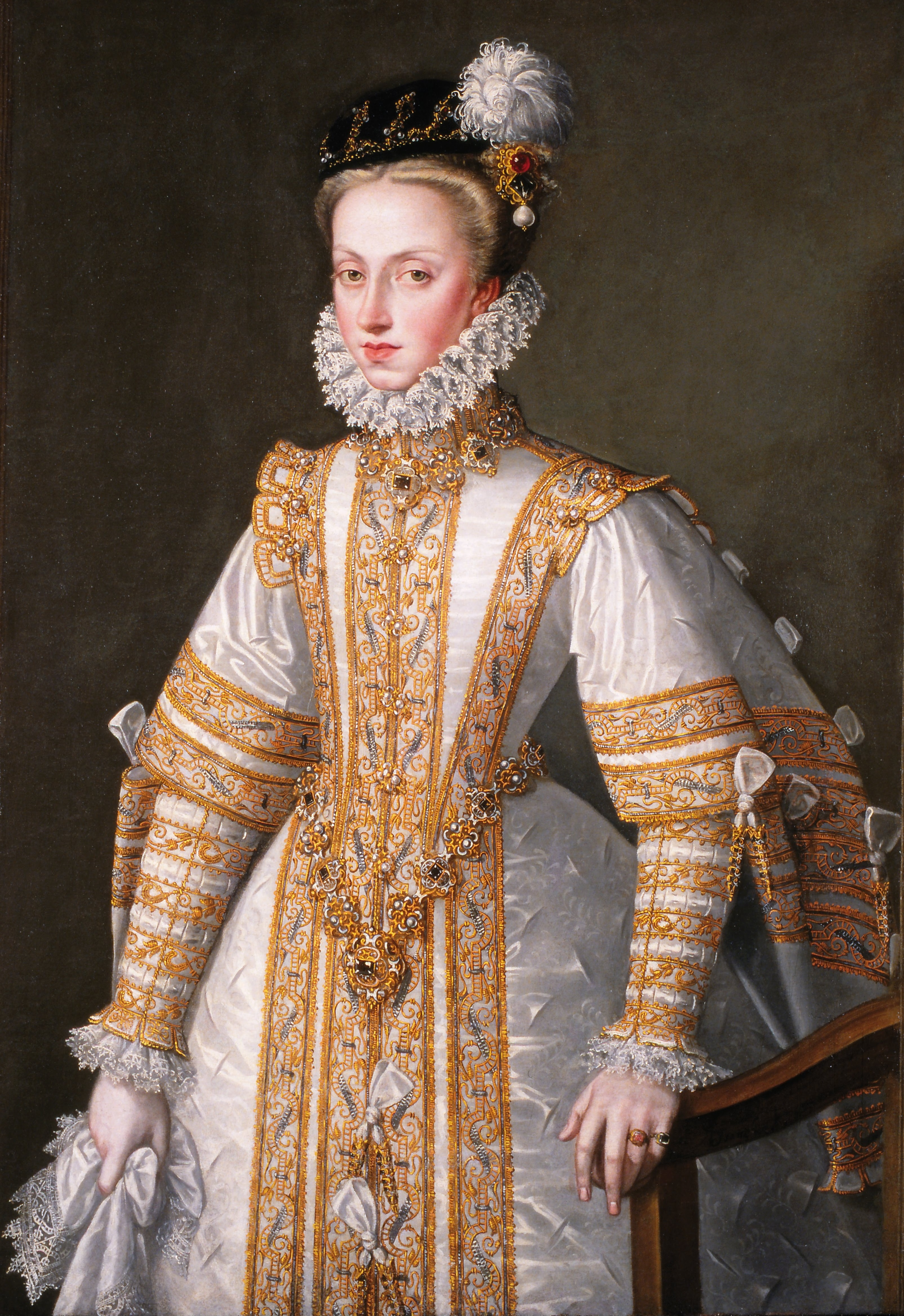
- Portrait by Alonso Sánchez Coello, c. 1571

Queen consort of Spain
- Tenure: 4 May 1570 – 26 October 1580

Queen consort of Portugal
- Tenure: 12 September 1580 – 26 October 1580
- Born: 1 November 1549; Cigales, Crown of Castile
- Died: 26 October 1580 (aged 30); Badajoz, Crown of Castile
- Burial: El Escorial
- Spouse: Philip II of Spain (m. 1570)
- Issue Detail: Ferdinand, Prince of Asturias; Diego, Prince of Asturias; Philip III of Spain
- House: Habsburg
- Father: Maximilian II, Holy Roman Emperor
- Mother: Maria of Austria

Anna of Austria (1 November 1549 – 26 October 1580) was Queen of Spain by marriage to her uncle, King Philip II of Spain. During her last days of life, she was also briefly Queen of Portugal.

== Life ==
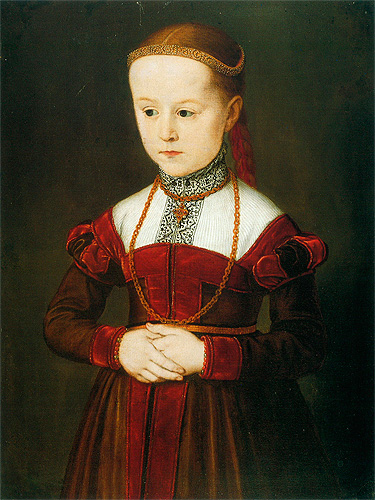
Anna as an Austrian archduchess

Anna was the eldest daughter of Maximilian II, Holy Roman Emperor, and Maria of Spain, who were first cousins.

She was born in Spain during the reign of her maternal grandfather, Charles V, Holy Roman Emperor, but lived in Vienna from the age of four. Anna was considered her father's favorite child. The story goes that he enjoyed playing and gambling with her and once a meeting of the Diet of Hungary was postponed because Anna was sick. She received a Catholic education.

== Marriage ==
As the eldest daughter of the Holy Roman Emperor, Anna was a desirable candidate for marriage at the European courts. Her parents thought a Spanish marriage would strengthen links between the Austrian and Spanish Habsburg families. Initially she considered her cousin, Don Carlos, the only son of her maternal uncle Philip II of Spain. These plans were shattered in 1568 when Don Carlos died. Plans for a Spanish marriage were revived when Philip's third wife, Elisabeth of Valois, died in childbirth, also in 1568.

As a result, Philip was left a widower with two young daughters, Isabella Clara Eugenia and Catalina Micaela. He planned to remarry because he no longer had a male heir. The marriage was at first opposed by many, including Pope Pius V, but arranged all the same.

In February 1569, Anna's engagement to her uncle Philip II was announced. In May 1570, they married by proxy. She traveled from Austria to Spain in the autumn of 1570, accompanied by her brothers Albert and Wenceslaus. Anna passed along the English Channel, where Elizabeth I sent her admirals, Charles Howard and William Wynter, to offer support and safe passage.

They traveled through the Netherlands, where Anna was accosted by friends and relatives of Floris of Montigny, the younger brother of the executed Count of Horn. Floris had been imprisoned in Spain since 1567. Now that King Philip had entered into a new marriage, Floris' family and friends hoped for leniency. They received a promise from the future queen that she would do her utmost to free Floris; however, she was unsuccessful, with Floris being strangled on the orders of the king. On 3 October Anna arrived on Spanish soil, but before she could reach the king, Floris was secretly put to death on 16 October 1570.

== Queen of Spain ==
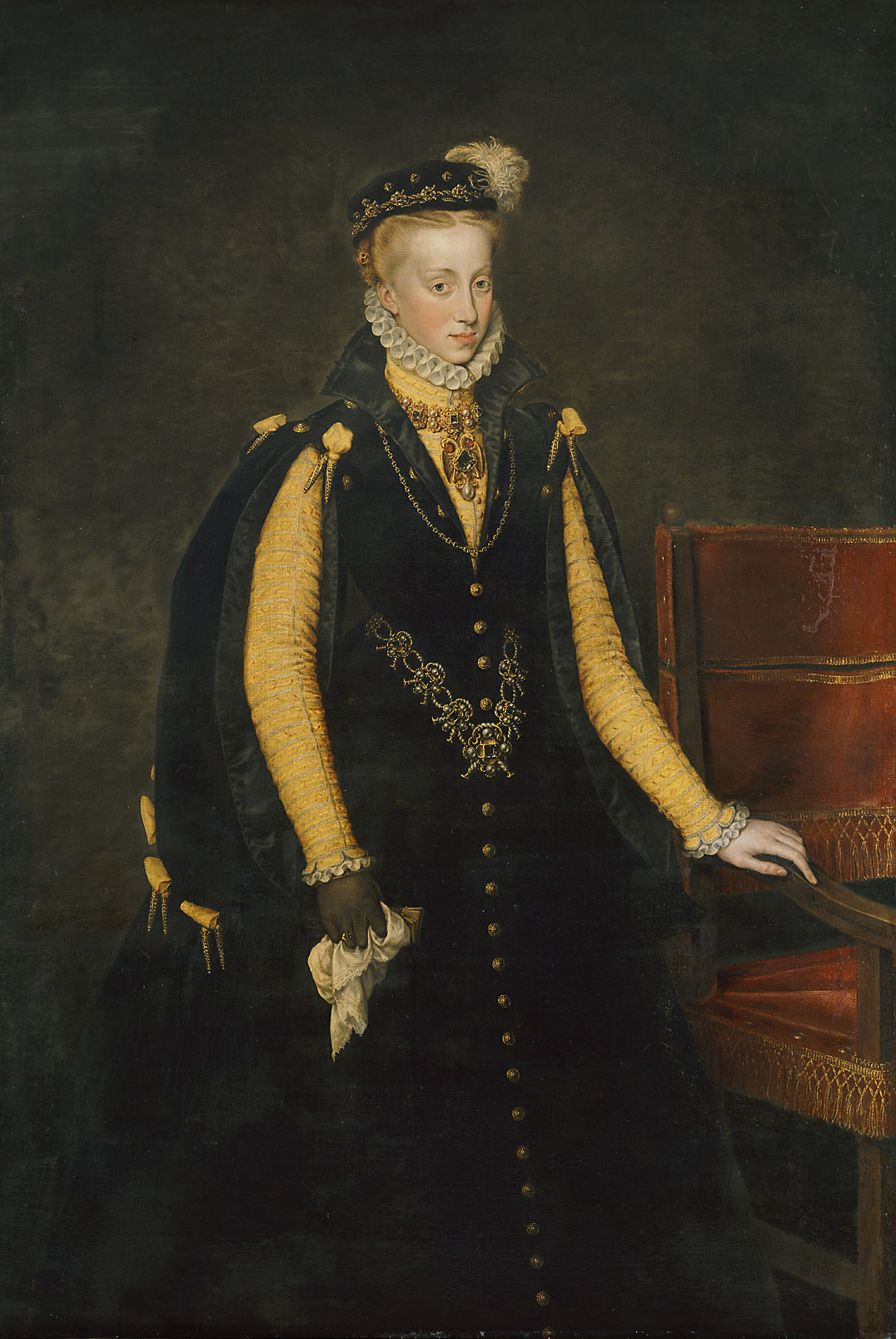
1570 portrait by Anthonis Mor

Upon her arrival in Spain, Anna was provided with a new household formed under the direction of the experienced and influential lady-in-waiting Margarita de Cardona, who had previously been the lady-in-waiting of her mother and who would have been known to her since her childhood in Austria. Queen Anna was described as vivid and cheerful, and managed to ease up some of the stiff atmosphere at the Spanish court. Anna busied herself mostly with needlework.

The marriage between Anna and Philip is described as happy. Besides being her father's favorite child, Anna was reportedly also Philip's most beloved wife. According to diplomats, the king was in love with his young bride. There are no records of Philip having mistresses during the time of their marriage. Anna had a personality very much like his own, and he was devoted to her. Philip was a conscientious monarch and maintained his relationship with Anna twice a week in the form of notes, as well as visiting his wife's bedchamber up to three times a day.

Arms of Anna as queen consort of Spain

Anna gave birth to five children, including four sons, of whom the eldest three died before Philip, and the youngest eventually succeeded him as Philip III. Anna was also described as a good stepmother to Isabella Clara Eugenia and Catherine Michelle.

In 1580 she was in Badajoz, where the court was briefly based because of Philip II's claim to the Portuguese throne. She died there of influenza, eight months after giving birth to her last child, Maria, who outlived her mother by less than three years. Anna was initially buried in Badajoz, but her body was later transferred to El Escorial.

== Children ==
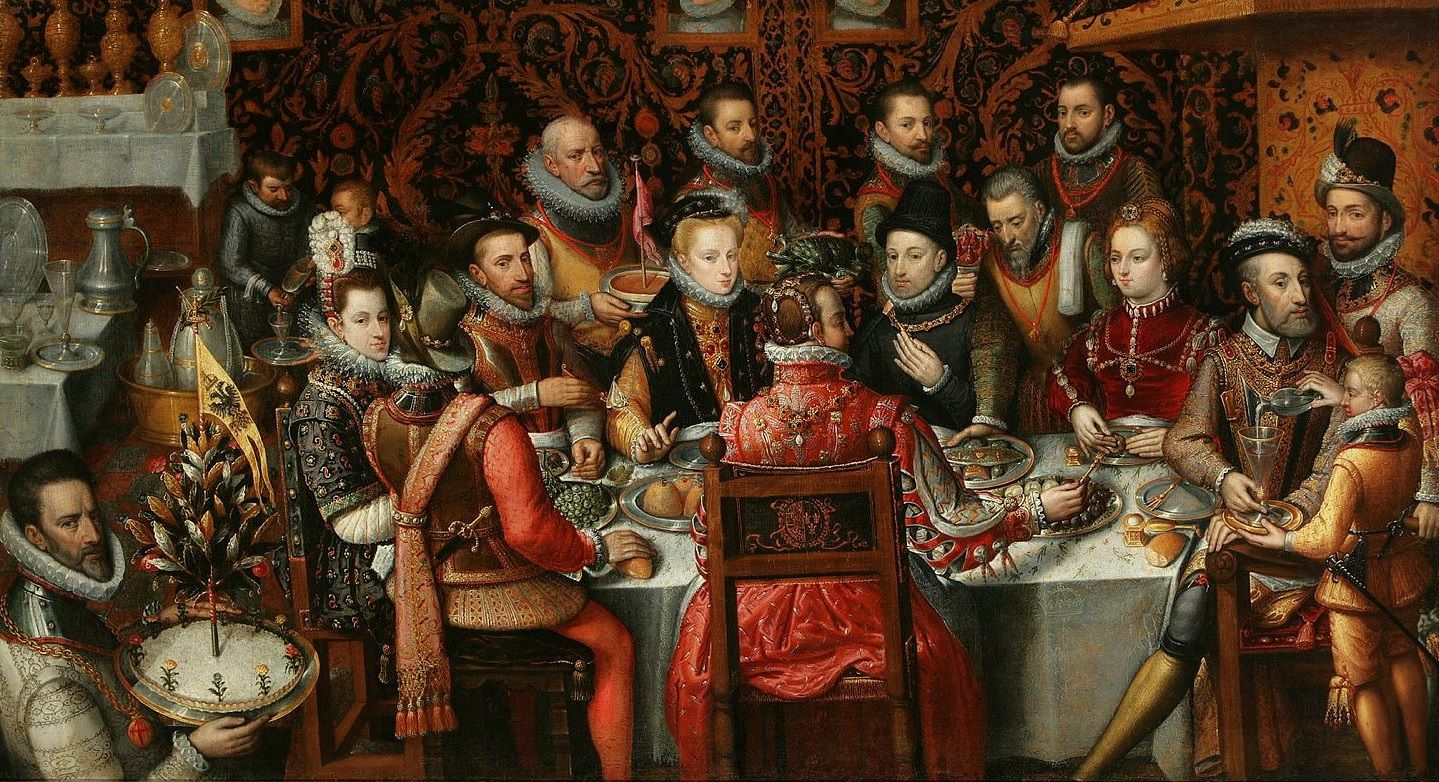
King Philip and Queen Anna banqueting with family and courtiers, by Alonso Sánchez Coello, c. 1596

1. Ferdinand, Prince of Asturias (4 December 1571 – 18 October 1578)
2. Carlos Lorenzo (12 August 1573 – 30 June 1575)
3. Diego, Prince of Asturias (15 August 1575 – 21 November 1582)
4. Philip III of Spain (3 April 1578 – 31 March 1621), succeeded his father, the only child to live to adulthood.
5. Maria (14 February 1580 – 5 August 1583)

== Ancestry ==
Ancestors of Anna of Austria

8. Philip, Duke of Burgundy
4. Ferdinand I, Holy Roman Emperor
9. Joanna of Aragon
2. Maximilian II, Holy Roman Emperor
10. Vladislas II of Bohemia and Hungary
5. Anne of Bohemia and Hungary
11. Anne of Foix-Candale
1. Anna of Austria
12. Philip, Duke of Burgundy (= 8)
6. Charles V, Holy Roman Emperor
13. Joanna of Aragon (= 9)
3. Maria of Austria
14. Manuel I of Portugal
7. Isabella of Portugal
15. Maria of Aragon

== Literature ==
- J. Brouwer, Montigny, Representative of the Netherlands by Philip II (Amsterdam z.j. [1941]).
- R. Rodríguez Raso, Maximiliano de Austria, gobernador de Carlos V en España: cartas al emperador (Madrid 1963).
- Fernando González-Doria, Las Reinas de España (Madrid 1986).
- A. W. Lovett, Early Habsburg Spain, 1517-1598 (Oxford 1986).
- John Lynch, Spain 1516-1598. From nation state to world empire (Oxford 1991).
- Geoffrey Parker, Philip II (Chicago / La Salle 1996).
- Henry Kamen, Philip of Spain (New Haven / London 1997).
- Manuel Ríos Mazcarelle, Reinas de España. Casa de Austria (Madrid 1998).
- L. Cabrera de Córdoba, Historia de Felipe II, rey de España, J. Martínez Millán and C.J. ed the Carlos Morales (Madrid 1998).
- Paula Sutter Fichtner, The Emperor Maximilian II (New Haven 2001).
- Pedro Gargantilla, Enfermedades de los reyes de España. Los Austrias. De la locura a la impotencia de Juana de Carlos II el Hechizado (Madrid 2005).

Anna of Austria, Queen of Spain House of Habsburg Born: 1 November 1549 Died: 26 October 1580
Royal titles
| Vacant Title last held by Elisabeth of France | Queen consort of Spain; 1570–1580 | Vacant Title next held by Margaret of Austria |
| Vacant Title last held by Catherine of Austria | Queen consort of Portugal; 1580 | Vacant Title next held by Margaret of Austria |
