= Maximilian II, Holy Roman Emperor =

Holy Roman Emperor from 1564 to 1576

Maximilian II
- Imperator Romanorum
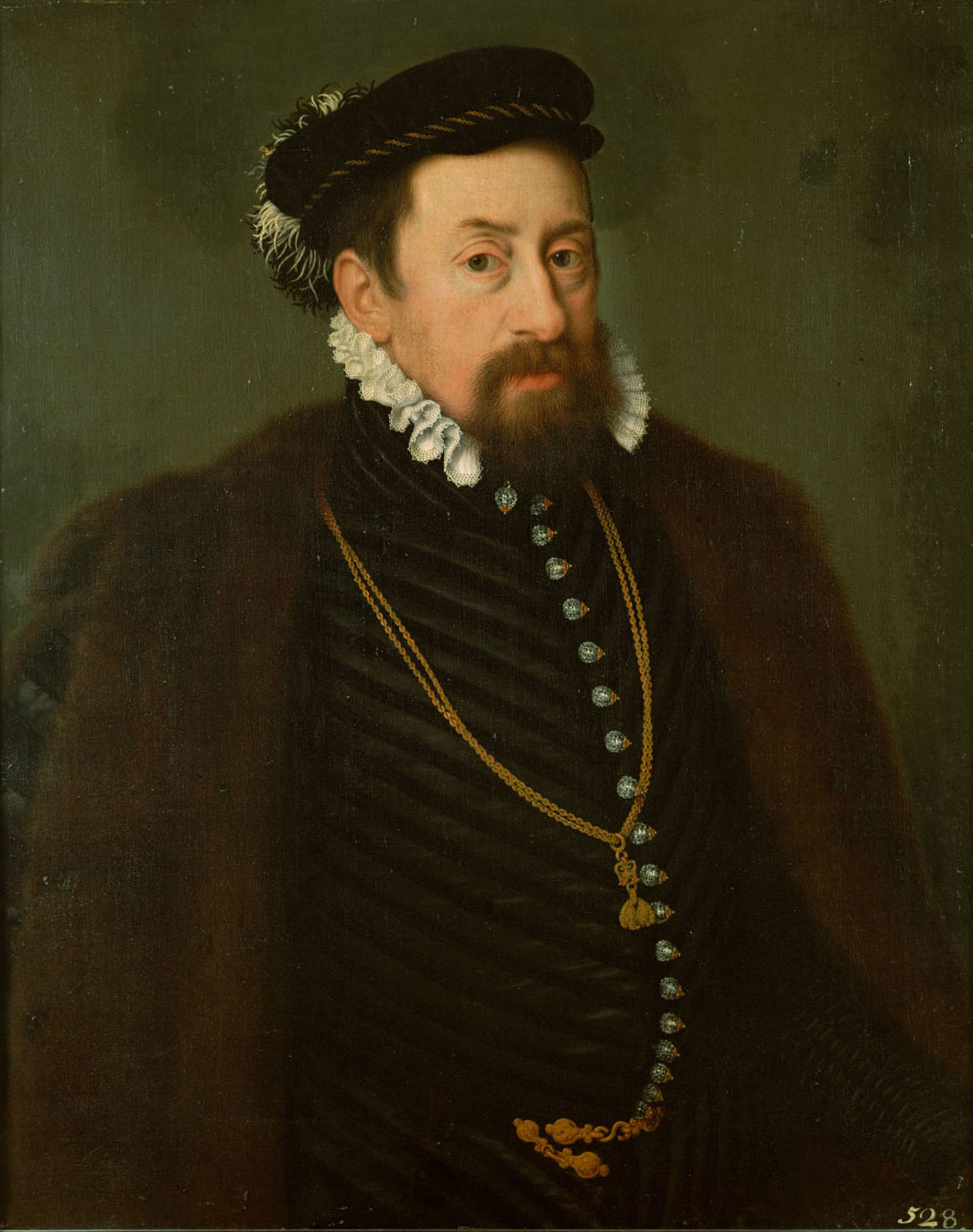
- Portrait by Nicolas Neufchâtel, c. 1566

Holy Roman Emperor
- Reign: 25 July 1564 – 12 October 1576
- Predecessor: Ferdinand I
- Successor: Rudolf II
- Born: 31 July 1527; Vienna, Archduchy of Austria, Holy Roman Empire
- Died: 12 October 1576 (aged 49); Imperial City of Regensburg, Holy Roman Empire
- Burial: Prague, St. Vitus Cathedral
- Spouse: Maria of Austria (m. 1548)
- Issue more...: Anna, Queen of Spain; Rudolf II, Holy Roman Emperor; Archduke Ernest; Elisabeth, Queen of France; Matthias, Holy Roman Emperor; Maximilian III, Archduke of Austria; Albert VII, Archduke of Austria; Archduke Wenceslaus; Archduchess Margaret
- House: Habsburg
- Father: Ferdinand I, Holy Roman Emperor
- Mother: Anna of Bohemia and Hungary

Maximilian II (31 July 1527 – 12 October 1576) was Holy Roman Emperor from 1564 until his death in 1576. A member of the Austrian House of Habsburg, he was crowned King of Bohemia in Prague on 14 May 1562 and elected King of Germany (King of the Romans) on 24 November 1562. On 8 September 1563, he was crowned King of Hungary and Croatia in the Hungarian capital Pressburg (Pozsony in Hungarian; now Bratislava, Slovakia). On 25 July 1564, he succeeded his father Ferdinand I as Holy Roman Emperor.

Maximilian's rule was shaped by the confessionalisation process after the 1555 Peace of Augsburg. Though a Habsburg and a Catholic, he approached the Lutheran Imperial estates with a view to overcome the denominational schism, which ultimately failed. He also was faced with the ongoing Ottoman–Habsburg wars and rising conflicts with his Spanish Habsburg cousins.

According to historian Paula Sutter Fichtner, Maximilian failed to achieve his three major aims: rationalising the government structure, unifying Christianity, and evicting the Turks from Hungary. Peter Marshall opines that it is wrong to dismiss Maximilian as a failure. According to Marshall, through his religious tolerance as well as his encouragement of arts and sciences, he succeeded in maintaining a precarious peace.

== Biography ==
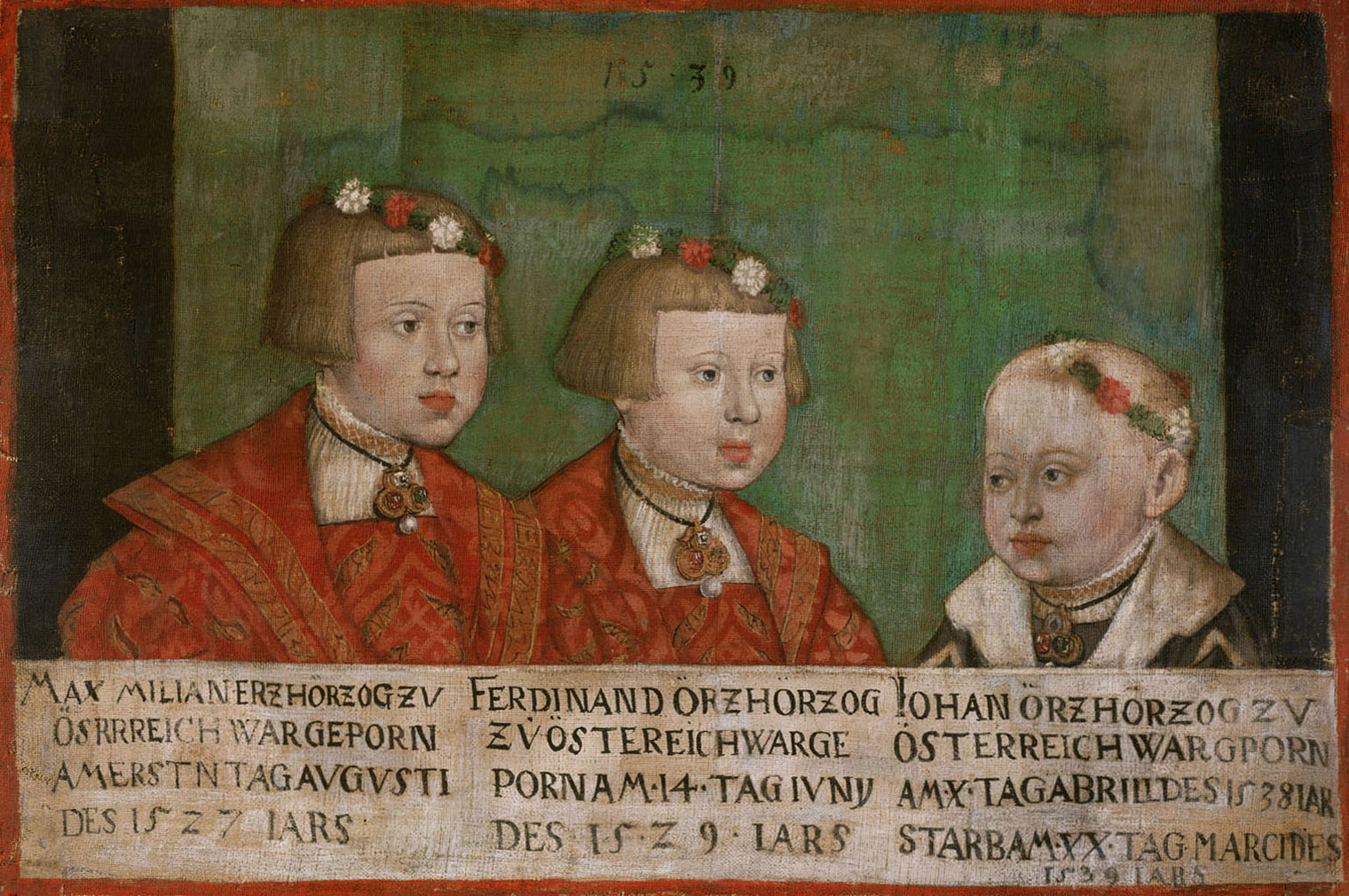
Maximilian and his younger brothers Ferdinand II and John, painting by Jakob Seisenegger, 1539

Maximilian was born in Vienna, Austria, the second child and eldest son of the Habsburg King Ferdinand I and the Jagiellonian Princess Anne of Bohemia and Hungary (1503–1547). He was named after his great-grandfather, Emperor Maximilian I. At the time of his birth, his father Ferdinand succeeded his brother-in-law King Louis II of Hungary in the Kingdom of Bohemia and the Kingdom of Hungary, greatly expanding the Habsburg monarchy. Maximilian's uncle was Emperor Charles V, Holy Roman Emperor.

Having spent his childhood years at his father's court in Innsbruck, Tyrol, Maximilian was educated principally in Italy. Among his teachers were humanist scholars like Kaspar Ursinus Velius and Georg Tannstetter. He also came in contact with the Lutheran teaching and early on corresponded with the Protestant prince Augustus of Saxony. From the age of 17, he gained some experience of warfare during the Italian War campaign of his uncle Charles V, Holy Roman Emperor against King Francis I of France in 1544, and also during the Schmalkaldic War. Upon Charles' victory in the 1547 Battle of Mühlberg, Maximilian put in a good word for the Schmalkaldic leaders, Elector John Frederick I, Elector of Saxony and Philip I, Landgrave of Hesse, and soon began to take part in Imperial business.

=== Heir apparent ===
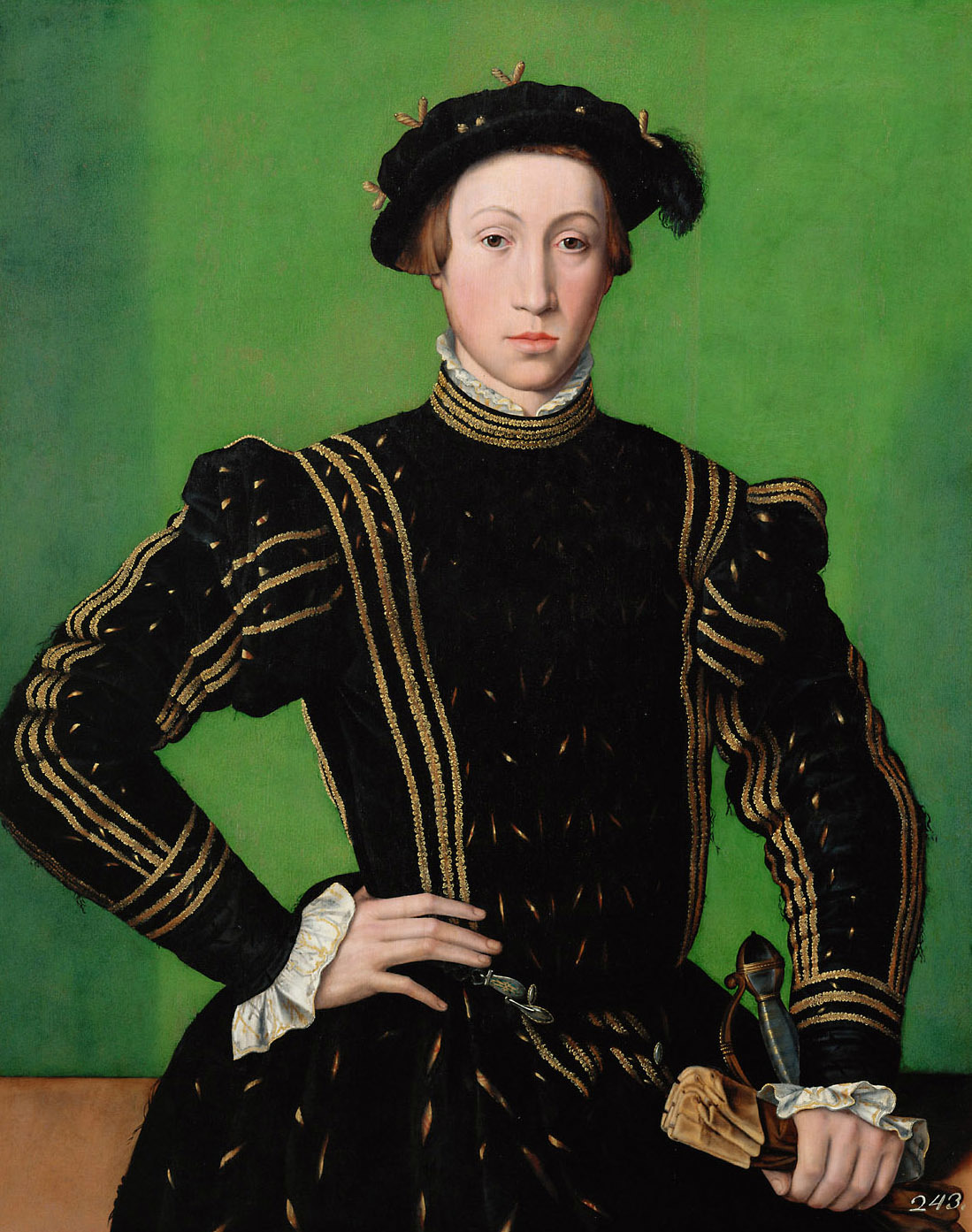
Archduke Maximilian, portrait by William Scrots, about 1544

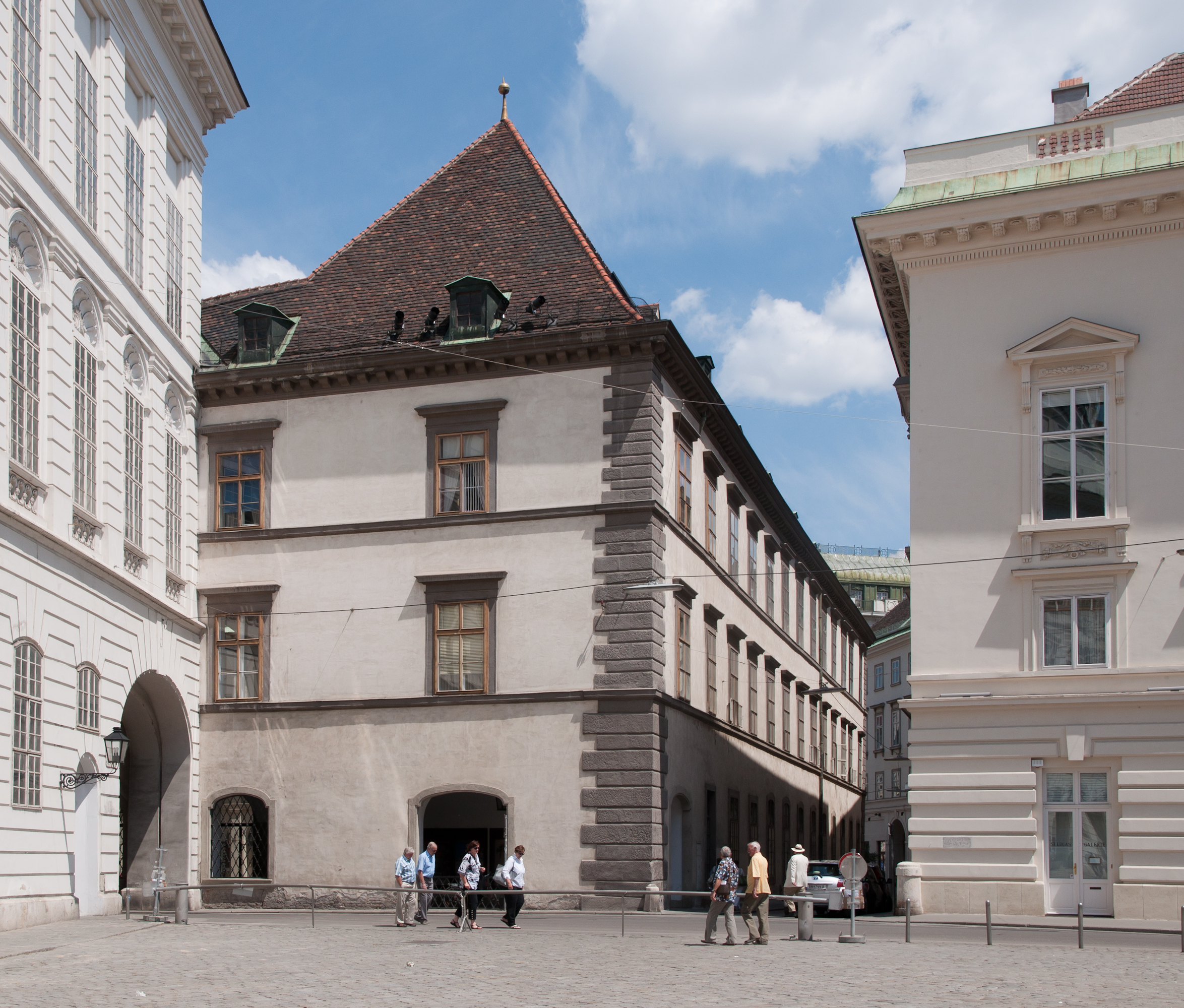
Stallburg

On 13 September 1548, Maximilian married his uncle Charles's daughter, Maria of Spain in the Castile residence of Valladolid. Through the marriage, his uncle intended to strengthen the ties with the Spanish branch of the Habsburgs, but also to consolidate his nephew's Catholic faith. Maximilian temporarily acted as the emperor's representative in Spain, but not as stadtholder of the Habsburg Netherlands as he had hoped. To his indignation, King Ferdinand appointed his younger brother Ferdinand II, Archduke of Austria administrator in the Kingdom of Bohemia, but Maximilian's right of succession as the future king was nevertheless recognised in 1549. He returned to Germany in December 1550 in order to take part in the discussion over the Imperial succession.

Maximilian's relations with his uncle worsened, as Charles V, again embattled by rebellious Protestant princes led by Elector Maurice of Saxony, wished his son Philip II of Spain to succeed him as emperor. However, Charles' brother Ferdinand, who had already been elected as the next occupant of the imperial throne, and his son Maximilian, objected to this proposal. Maximilian sought the support of the German princes such as Albert V, Duke of Bavaria and even contacted Protestant leaders like Maurice of Saxony and Christoph, Duke of Württemberg. At length, a compromise was reached: Philip was to succeed Ferdinand, but during the former's reign, Maximilian, as King of the Romans, was to govern Germany. This arrangement was not carried out, and is only important because the insistence of the emperor seriously disturbed the harmonious relations that had hitherto existed between the two branches of the Habsburg family; an illness that befell Maximilian in 1552 was attributed to poison given to him in the interests of his cousin and brother-in-law, Philip II of Spain.

The relationship between the two cousins was uneasy. While Philip had been raised a Spaniard and barely travelled out of the kingdom during his life, Maximilian identified himself as the quintessential German prince and often displayed a strong dislike of Spaniards, whom he considered intolerant and arrogant. While his cousin was reserved and shy, Maximilian was outgoing and charismatic. His adherence to humanism and religious tolerance put him at odds with Philip, who was more committed to the defence of the Catholic faith. Also, he was considered a promising commander, while Philip disliked war and only once personally commanded an army. Nonetheless, the two remained committed to the unity of their dynasty.

In 1551, Maximilian attended the Council of Trent and the next year took up his residence at the Hofburg palace in Vienna, celebrated by a triumphal return into the city with a large entourage including the elephant Suleiman. While his father Ferdinand concluded the 1552 Treaty of Passau with the Protestant estates and finally reached the Peace of Augsburg in 1555, Maximilian was engaged mainly in the government of the Austrian hereditary lands and in defending them against Ottoman incursions. In Vienna, he had his Hofburg residence extended with the Renaissance Stallburg wing, the site of the later Spanish Riding School, and also ordered the construction of Neugebäude Palace in Simmering. In the 1550s, Vienna had more than 50,000 inhabitants, making it the largest city in Central Europe, with Prague and Nuremberg (40,000 inhabitants).

The religious views of the future King of Bohemia had always been somewhat uncertain, and he had probably learned something of Lutheranism in his youth; but his amicable relations with several Protestant princes, which began about the time of the discussion over the succession, were probably due more to political than to religious considerations. However, in Vienna, he became very intimate with Sebastian Pfauser, a court preacher influenced by Heinrich Bullinger with strong leanings towards Lutheranism, and his religious attitude caused some uneasiness to his father. Fears were freely expressed that he would definitely leave the Catholic Church, and when his father Ferdinand became emperor in 1558, he was prepared to assure Pope Paul IV that his son should not succeed him if he took this step. Eventually, Maximilian remained nominally an adherent of the older faith, although his views were tinged with Lutheranism until the end of his life. After several refusals, he consented in 1560 to the banishment of Pfauser and began again to attend the Masses of the Catholic Church.

=== Reign ===
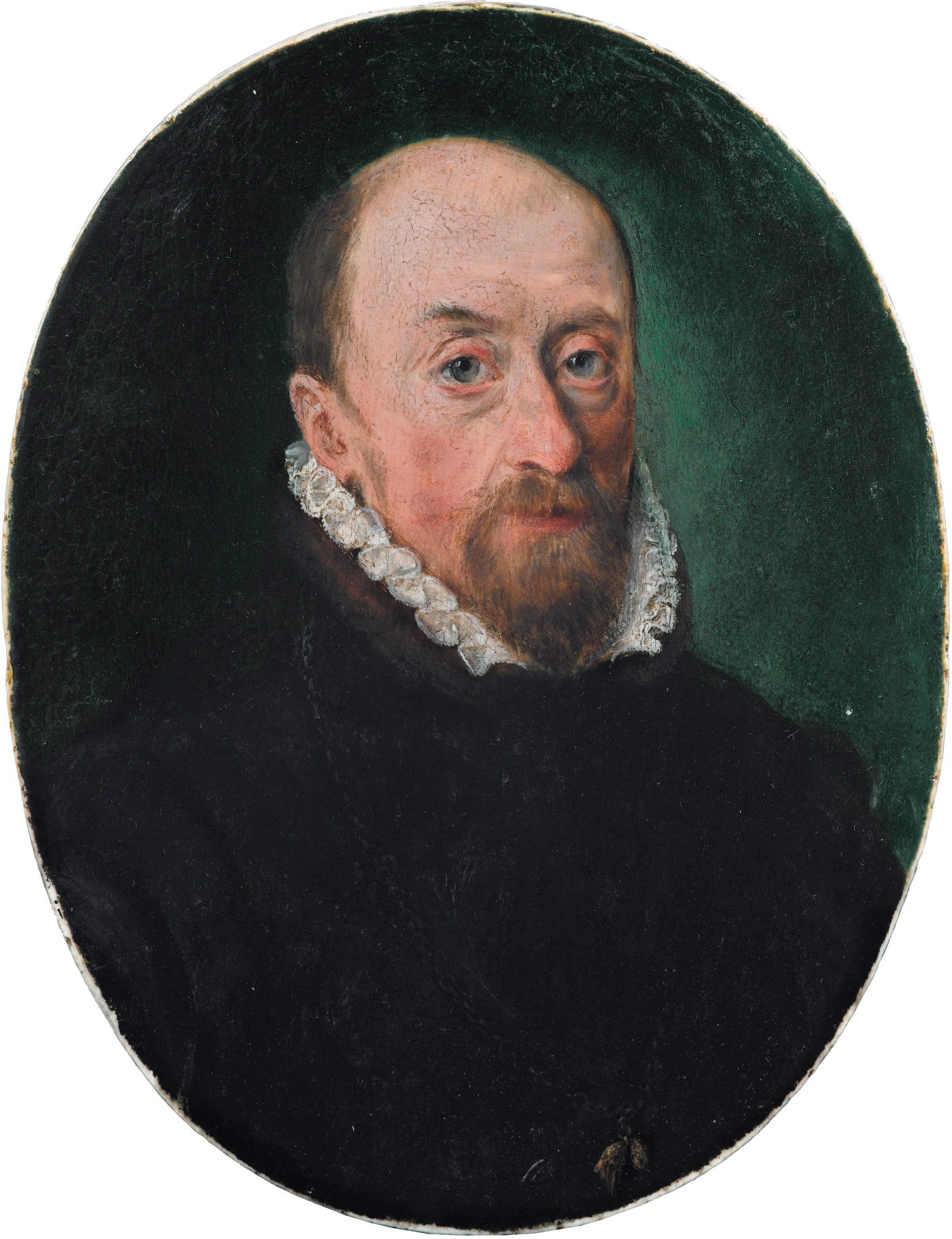
Maximilian II (Sofonisba Anguissola, c. 1580)

In November 1562 Maximilian was chosen King of the Romans, or German king, by the electoral college at Frankfurt, where he was crowned a few days later, after assuring the Catholic electors of his fidelity to their faith, and promising the Protestant electors that he would publicly accept the confession of Augsburg when he became emperor. He also took the usual oath to protect the Church, and his election was afterwards confirmed by the papacy. He was the first King of the Romans not to be crowned in Aachen. In September 1563, he was crowned King of Hungary by the Archbishop of Esztergom, Nicolaus Olahus, and on his father's death, in July 1564, he succeeded to the empire and to the kingdoms of Hungary, Croatia and Bohemia.

The new emperor had already shown that he believed in the necessity for a thorough reform of the Church. He was unable, however, to obtain the consent of Pope Pius IV to the marriage of the clergy and in 1568, the concession of communion in both kinds to the laity was withdrawn. On his part, Maximilian granted religious liberty to the Lutheran nobles and knights in Austria, and refused to allow the publication of the decrees of the Council of Trent. Amidst general expectations on the part of the Protestants, he met his first summoned Diet of Augsburg in March 1566. He refused to accede to the demands of the Lutheran princes; on the other hand, although the increase of sectarianism was discussed, no decisive steps were taken to suppress it, and the only result of the meeting was a grant of assistance for the war with the Ottomans, which had just been renewed. Maximilian gathered a large army and marched to fight the Ottomans. The Ottomans besieged and conquered Szigetvár in 1566, but their sultan, Suleiman the Magnificent, died of old age during the siege. With neither side winning a decisive engagement, Maximilian's ambassadors Antun Vrančić and Christoph Teuffenbach met with the Ottoman Grand Vizier Sokollu Mehmed Pasha in Adrianople to negotiate a truce in 1568. The terms of the Treaty of Adrianople required the emperor to recognise Ottoman suzerainty over Transylvania, Wallachia, and Moldavia.

Meanwhile, the relations between Maximilian and Philip of Spain had improved, and the emperor's increasingly cautious and moderate attitude in religious matters was doubtless because the death of Philip's son, Don Carlos, had opened the way for the succession of Maximilian, or of one of his sons, to the Spanish throne. Evidence of this friendly feeling was given in 1570, when the emperor's daughter, Anna of Austria, became the fourth wife of Philip; but Maximilian was unable to moderate the harsh proceedings of the Spanish king against the revolting inhabitants of the Netherlands. In 1570, the emperor met the Diet of Speyer and asked for aid to place his eastern borders in a state of defence, and also for power to repress the disorder caused by troops in the service of foreign powers passing through Germany. He proposed that his consent should be necessary before any soldiers for foreign service were recruited in the empire; but the estates were unwilling to strengthen the imperial authority, the Protestant princes regarded the suggestion as an attempt to prevent them from assisting their co-religionists in France and the Netherlands, and nothing was done in this direction, although some assistance was voted for the defense of Austria. The religious demands of the Protestants were still unsatisfied, while the policy of toleration had failed to give peace to Austria. Maximilian's power was very limited; it was inability rather than unwillingness that prevented him from yielding to the entreaties of Pope Pius V to join in an attack on the Turks both before and after the victory of Lepanto in 1571; and he remained inert while the authority of the empire in north-eastern Europe was threatened.

In 1576, Maximilian was elected by the part of Polish and Lithuanian magnates to be the King of Poland in opposition to Stephen Báthory, but he did not manage to become widely accepted there and was forced to leave Poland.

Maximilian died on 12 October 1576 in Regensburg while preparing to invade Poland. On his deathbed, he refused to receive the last sacraments of the Church. He is buried in St. Vitus Cathedral in Prague.

With his wife Maria, he had a family of ten sons and six daughters. He was succeeded by his eldest surviving son, Rudolf, who had been chosen king of the Romans in October 1575. Another of his sons, Matthias, also became emperor; three others, Ernest, Albert and Maximilian, took some part in the government of the Habsburg territories or of the Netherlands. His eldest daughter, Anna, married Philip II of Spain. Another daughter, Elizabeth, married Charles IX of France.

== Religious policies ==
Maximilian's policies of religious neutrality and peace in the empire afforded its Roman Catholics and Protestants a breathing space after the first struggles of the Reformation. His reign also saw the high point of Protestantism in Austria and Bohemia and unlike his successors, Maximilian did not try to suppress it.

He disappointed the German Protestant princes by his refusal to invest Lutheran administrators of prince-bishoprics with their imperial fiefs. Yet on a personal basis, he granted freedom of worship to the Protestant nobility and worked for reform in the Roman Catholic Church, including the right of priests to marry. This failed because of Spanish opposition.

Maximilian, the father-in-law of France's King Charles IX via his daughter Elisabeth, was deeply horrified by the St. Bartholomew's Day massacre of 1572. He reportedly condemned the slaughter of Huguenots (French Protestants) as a "shameful bloodbath."

Maximilian II was a member of the Order of the Golden Fleece.

== Patronage of arts and sciences ==
Under Ferdinand I and Maximilian II, the imperial court itself became the centre of humanist scholarship. The court held close ties to the University of Vienna, but the university, which reached its summit under Maximilian I, had been severely diminished due to wars and civil disturbances.

In his court, Catholic and Protestant scholars equally thrived. Many artists and scholars came from Spain, Italy and Spanish Netherlands. Maximilian employed scholars like the botanist Carolus Clusius and the diplomat Ogier Ghiselin de Busbecq. Maximilian's library, curated by Hugo Blotius, later became the nucleus of the Austrian National Library. He implemented the Roman School of composition with his court orchestra; however, his plans to win Giovanni Pierluigi da Palestrina as Kapellmeister foundered on financial reasons.

== Marriage and children ==
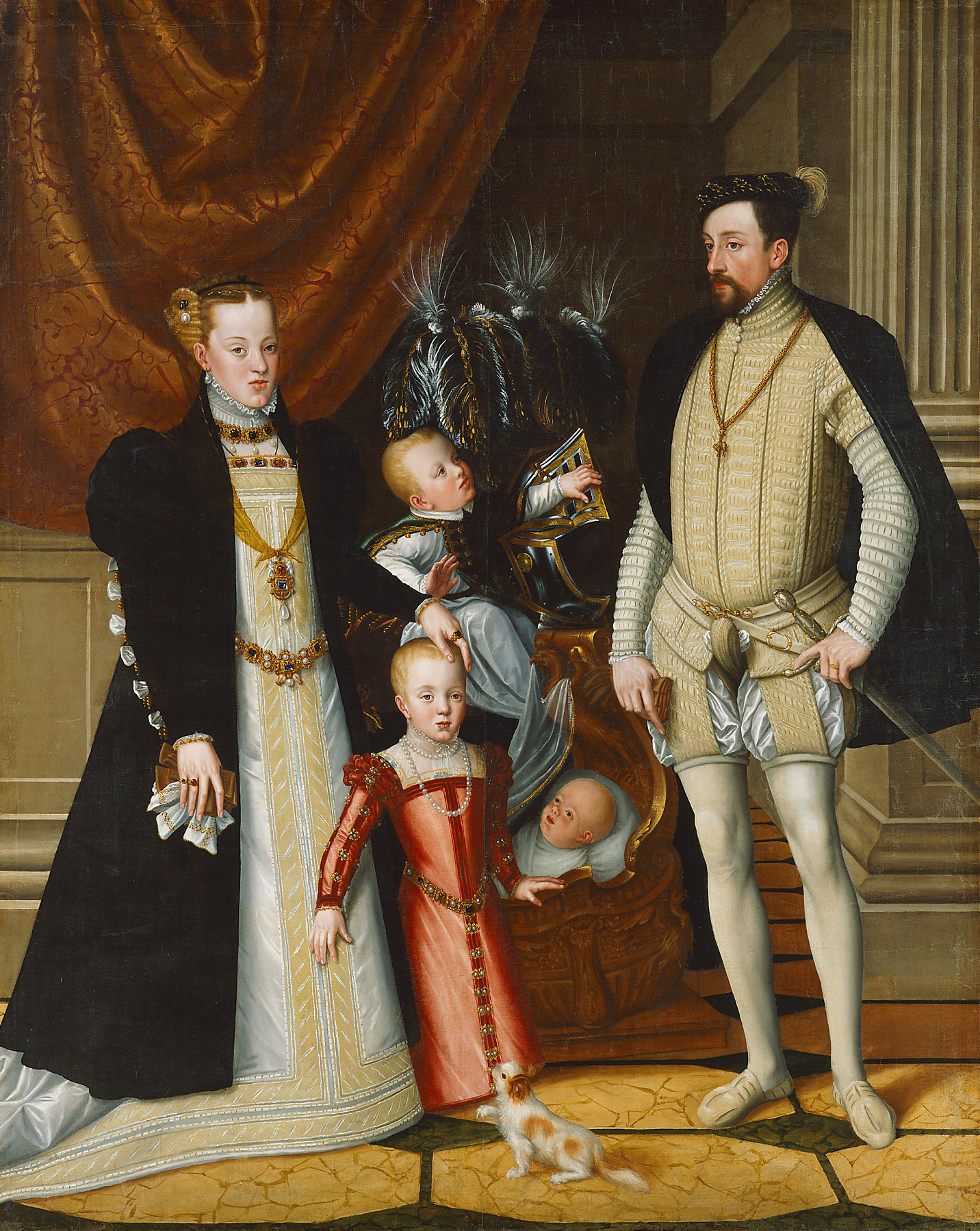
Maximilian II with his family in 1553, by Giuseppe Arcimboldo

On 13 September 1548, Maximilian married his first cousin Maria of Spain, daughter of Emperor Charles V and Isabella of Portugal. Despite Maria's commitment to Habsburg Spain and her strong Catholic manners, the marriage was a happy one. The couple had sixteen children in just nineteen years, but only nine of them lived to adulthood:

1. Anna (1 November 1549 – 26 October 1580), who became queen of Spain
2. Ferdinand (28 March 1551 – 25 June 1552), who died in early childhood.
3. Rudolf (18 July 1552 – 20 January 1612), who became emperor
4. Ernest (15 July 1553 – 12 February 1595), who served as governor of the Habsburg Netherlands
5. Elisabeth (5 July 1554 – 22 January 1592), who became queen of France
6. Marie (27 July 1555 – 25 June 1556), who died in infancy
7. Matthias (24 February 1557 – 20 March 1619), who became emperor
8. A stillborn son (20 October 1557)
9. Maximilian (12 October 1558 – 2 November 1618), who served as Grand Master of the Teutonic Order and administrator of Prussia.
10. Albert (13 November 1559 – 13 July 1621), who served as governor of the Habsburg Netherlands
11. Wenceslaus (9 March 1561 – 22 September 1578)
12. Frederick (21 June 1562 – 16 January 1563), who died in infancy
13. Marie (19 February 1564 – 26 March 1564), who died in infancy
14. Charles (26 September 1565 – 23 May 1566), who died in infancy
15. Margaret (25 January 1567 – 5 July 1633), a nun
16. Eleanor (4 November 1568 – 12 March 1580), who died in childhood

== Heraldry ==
Heraldry of Maximilian II, Holy Roman Emperor

Coat of arms as Archduke of Austria (1527–1576)	Coat of arms as King of the Romans (1562–1576)	Coat of arms as Holy Roman Emperor (1564–1576)

== In popular culture ==
- Maximilian II figures in José Saramago's 2008 novel The Elephant's Journey.

== See also ==
- Kings of Germany family tree. He was related to every other king of Germany.

== Bibliography ==
- Gulyás, Borbála (2020). "The Fight Against the Ottomans in Hungary and the Court Festivals of the Habsburgs in the Sixteenth Century". In Fodor, Pál; Ács, Pál (eds.). Identity and Culture in Ottoman Hungary. De Gruyter Brill. pp. 277–300. ISBN 9783112209301.
- Wilson, Peter H. (2016). Heart of Europe: A History of the Holy Roman Empire. Harvard University Press. ISBN 9780674058095.

Maximilian II, Holy Roman Emperor House of Habsburg Born: 31 July 1527 Died: 12 October 1576
Regnal titles
Preceded by Ferdinand I, Holy Roman Emperor	King of Germany; King of Bohemia; 1562 – 1576 with Ferdinand I, Holy Roman Emperor (1562 – 1564)	Succeeded by Rudolf II, Holy Roman Emperor
Preceded by Ferdinand I, Holy Roman Emperor	King of Hungary and Croatia; 1563 – 1576 with Ferdinand I, Holy Roman Emperor (1563 – 1564)	Succeeded by Rudolf II, Holy Roman Emperor
Preceded by Ferdinand I, Holy Roman Emperor	Holy Roman Emperor; Archduke of Austria; 1564 – 1576	Succeeded by Rudolf II, Holy Roman Emperor
