= Maria of Austria, Holy Roman Empress =

Holy Roman Empress from 1564 to 1576

Maria of Spain
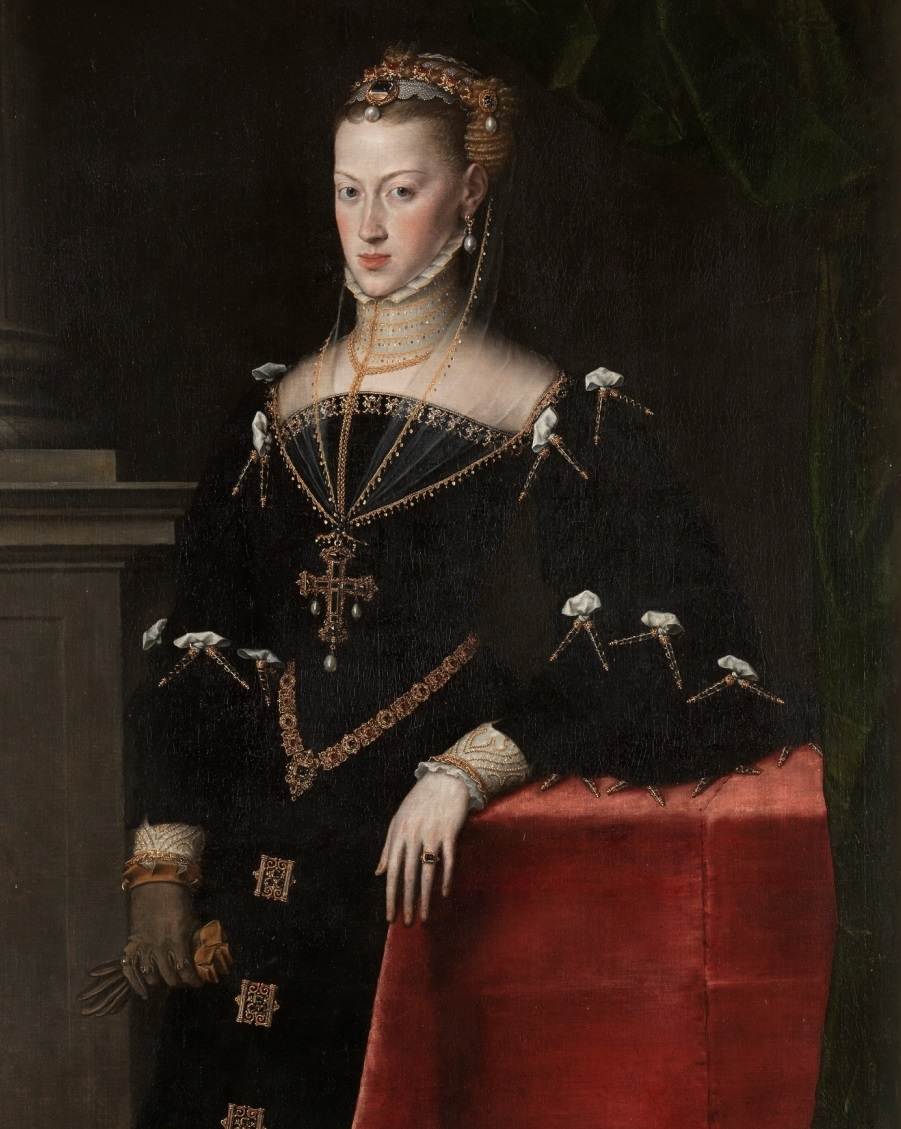
- Portrait by Antonis Mor, 1551

Holy Roman Empress; Queen consort of Germany and Bohemia; Archduchess consort of Austria
- Tenure: 25 July 1564 – 12 October 1576

Regent of Spain
- Tenure: 1 October 1548 – 12 July 1551 (co-regent with her husband)

Queen consort of Hungary
- Tenure: 8 September 1563 – 12 October 1576
- Coronation: 9 September 1563
- Born: 21 June 1528; Madrid, Crown of Castile
- Died: 26 February 1603 (aged 74); Convent of Las Descalzas Reales, Madrid, Crown of Castile
- Burial: Convent of Las Descalzas Reales, Madrid, Spain
- Spouse: Maximilian II, Holy Roman Emperor (m. 1548; died 1576)
- Issue more...: Anna, Queen of Spain; Rudolf II, Holy Roman Emperor; Archduke Ernest; Elisabeth, Queen of France; Matthias, Holy Roman Emperor; Maximilian III of Austria; Albert VII of Austria; Archduke Wenceslaus; Archduchess Margaret
- House: Habsburg
- Father: Charles V, Holy Roman Emperor
- Mother: Isabella of Portugal
- Religion: Roman Catholicism

Maria of Austria or Maria of Spain (21 June 1528 – 26 February 1603), also known as Isabel, was the empress consort and queen consort of Maximilian II, Holy Roman Emperor, King of Bohemia and Hungary. She served as regent of Spain in the absence of her father Emperor Charles V from 1548 until 1551 and was one of the most powerful empresses of the Holy Roman Empire.

== Early life ==
Born in the Royal Alcázar of Madrid on 21 June 1528, Maria was the eldest daughter of Charles V, Holy Roman Emperor and King of Spain, and Isabella of Portugal. She grew up mostly in Toledo and Valladolid with her siblings, Philip and Joanna. They built a strong family bond despite their father's regular absences. Maria and her brother, Philip, shared similar strong personal views and policies which they retained during the rest of their lives.

== As Regent of Spain ==
On 15 September 1548, aged twenty, Maria married her first cousin Archduke Maximilian. Despite Maria's commitment to Habsburg Spain and her strong Catholic manners, the marriage was a happy one. The couple had sixteen children in just nineteen years, but only nine of them lived to adulthood.

While her father was occupied with German affairs, Maria and Maximilian acted as regents of Spain during the absence of Prince Philip from 1548 to 1550 and from 1550 she did so alone. Maria stayed at the Spanish court until August 1551, and in 1552, the couple moved to live at the court of Maximilian's father in Vienna.

== As Holy Roman Empress ==
In 1564, her husband succeeded his father Ferdinand I at his death, as Holy Roman Emperor, King of Bohemia, and King of Hungary. He ruled these domains until his death in 1576. Maria became Empress and Queen.

Maria was a devout Catholic and frequently disagreed with her religiously ambiguous husband about his religious tolerance.

During her life in Austria, Maria was reportedly ill at ease in a country which was not entirely Catholic, and she surrounded herself with a circle of strictly Catholic courtiers, many of whom she had brought with her from Spain. Her court was organized by her Spanish chief lady-in-waiting Maria de Requenes in a Spanish manner, and among her favorite companions was her Spanish lady-in-waiting Margarita de Cardona.

== As Holy Roman Empress Dowager ==
In 1576, Maximilian died. Maria remained at the Imperial Court for six years after his death. She had great influence over her sons, the future emperors Rudolf II and Matthias.

Maria returned to Spain in 1582, taking her youngest surviving child Archduchess Margaret with her, who was promised to marry Philip II of Spain, who had lost his fourth wife, her oldest daughter, Archduchess Anna in 1580.

Margaret finally refused and took the veil as a Poor Clare. Commenting that she was very happy to live in "a country without heretics", Maria then influenced quite a number of events in the Spanish Court until she eventually settled in the Convent of Las Descalzas Reales in Madrid, where she lived until her death in 1603.

She was the patron of the noted Spanish composer Tomás Luis de Victoria, and the great Requiem Mass he wrote in 1603 for her funeral is considered among the best and most refined of his works. Maria exerted some influence together with Queen Margaret, the wife of her grandson/nephew, Philip III of Spain. Margaret, the sister of the future Ferdinand II, Holy Roman Emperor, would be one of three women at Philip's court who would apply considerable influence over the king. Margaret was considered by contemporaries to be extremely pious—in some cases, excessively pious, and too influenced by the Church, and 'astute and very skillful' in her political dealings, although 'melancholic' and unhappy over the influence of the Duke of Lerma over her husband at court. Margaret continued to fight an ongoing battle with Lerma for influence until her death in 1611. Philip had an 'affectionate, close relationship' with Margaret, and paid her additional attention after they had a son, also named Philip, in 1605.

Maria, the Austrian representative to the Spanish court—and Margaret of the Cross, Maria's daughter—along with Queen Margaret, were a powerful Catholic and pro-Austrian faction in the court of Philip III of Spain. They were successful, for example, in convincing Philip to provide financial support to Ferdinand from 1600 onwards. Philip steadily acquired other religious advisors. Father Juan de Santa Maria, the confessor to Philip's daughter, Maria Anna, was felt by contemporaries to have an excessive influence over Philip at the end of his life, and both he and Luis de Aliaga Martínez, Philip's own confessor, were credited with the overthrow of Lerma in 1618. Similarly Mariana de San Jose, a favoured nun of Queen Margaret's, was also criticised for her later influence over the king's actions.

== Issue ==
Maria was constantly pregnant during much of her marriage, giving birth almost once (and sometimes twice) a year:

1. Anna (2 November 1549 – 26 October 1580), married her uncle Philip II of Spain
2. Ferdinand (28 March 1551 – 16 June 1552), died in early childhood
3. Rudolf II (18 July 1552 – 20 January 1612), emperor
4. Ernest (15 June 1553 – 12 February 1595), served as governor of the Habsburg Netherlands
5. Elisabeth (5 July 1554 – 22 January 1592), married Charles IX of France
6. Maria (27 July 1555 – 28 June 1556), died in infancy
7. Matthias (24 February 1557 – 20 March 1619), emperor
8. A stillborn son (born and died 20 October 1557)
9. Maximilian (12 October 1558 – 2 November 1618), served as grandmaster of the Teutonic Order and administrator of Prussia
10. Albert (15 November 1559 – 13 July 1621), served as governor of the Habsburg Netherlands
11. Wenceslaus (9 March 1561 – 22 September 1578)
12. Frederick (21 June 1562 – 25 January 1563), died in infancy
13. Maria (19 February 1564 – 26 March 1564), died in infancy
14. Charles (26 September 1565 – 23 May 1566), died in infancy
15. Margaret (25 January 1567 – 5 July 1633), a nun
16. Eleanor (4 November 1568 – 12 March 1580), died in childhood

Only five of Maria's children were still alive at the time of her death.

Maria of Austria, Holy Roman Empress Habsburg Born: 21 June 1528 Died: 26 February 1603
Royal titles
Vacant Title last held by Isabella of Portugal	Holy Roman Empress; 1564–1576	Vacant Title next held by Anna of Tyrol
Vacant Title last held by Anna Jagellonica	Queen consort of Germany and Bohemia; 1564–1576	Vacant Title next held by Anna of Tyrol
Vacant Title last held by Anna Jagellonica	Archduchess consort of Austria; 1564–1576	Vacant Title next held by Anna of Tyrol
Vacant Title last held by Anna Jagellonica	— DISPUTED — Queen consort of Hungary; 1563–1576; Disputed by Isabella Jagiellon	Vacant Title next held by Anna of Tyrol
