= Portrait of Isabella of Portugal =

Portrait of Isabella of Portugal may refer to:

- Portrait of Isabella of Portugal (van Eyck), now known only from copies, c. 1428, of Isabella of Portugal, Duchess of Burgundy
- Portrait of Isabella of Portugal (Titian), Prado, 1548. of Holy Roman Empress Isabella of Portugal
