= Philip of Portugal =

Philip of Portugal is the name of three Spanish kings who ruled over Portugal under a different ordinal number. In Spain they were known as Felipe, and in Portugal as Filipe.

- Philip I of Portugal or Philip II of Spain
- Philip II of Portugal or Philip III of Spain
- Philip III of Portugal or Philip IV of Spain

It's also the name of a Crown Prince of Portugal, son of John III of Portugal:

- Philip, Prince of Portugal (1533–1539)
