= Beatrice of Portugal, Duchess of Savoy =

Beatrice of Portugal
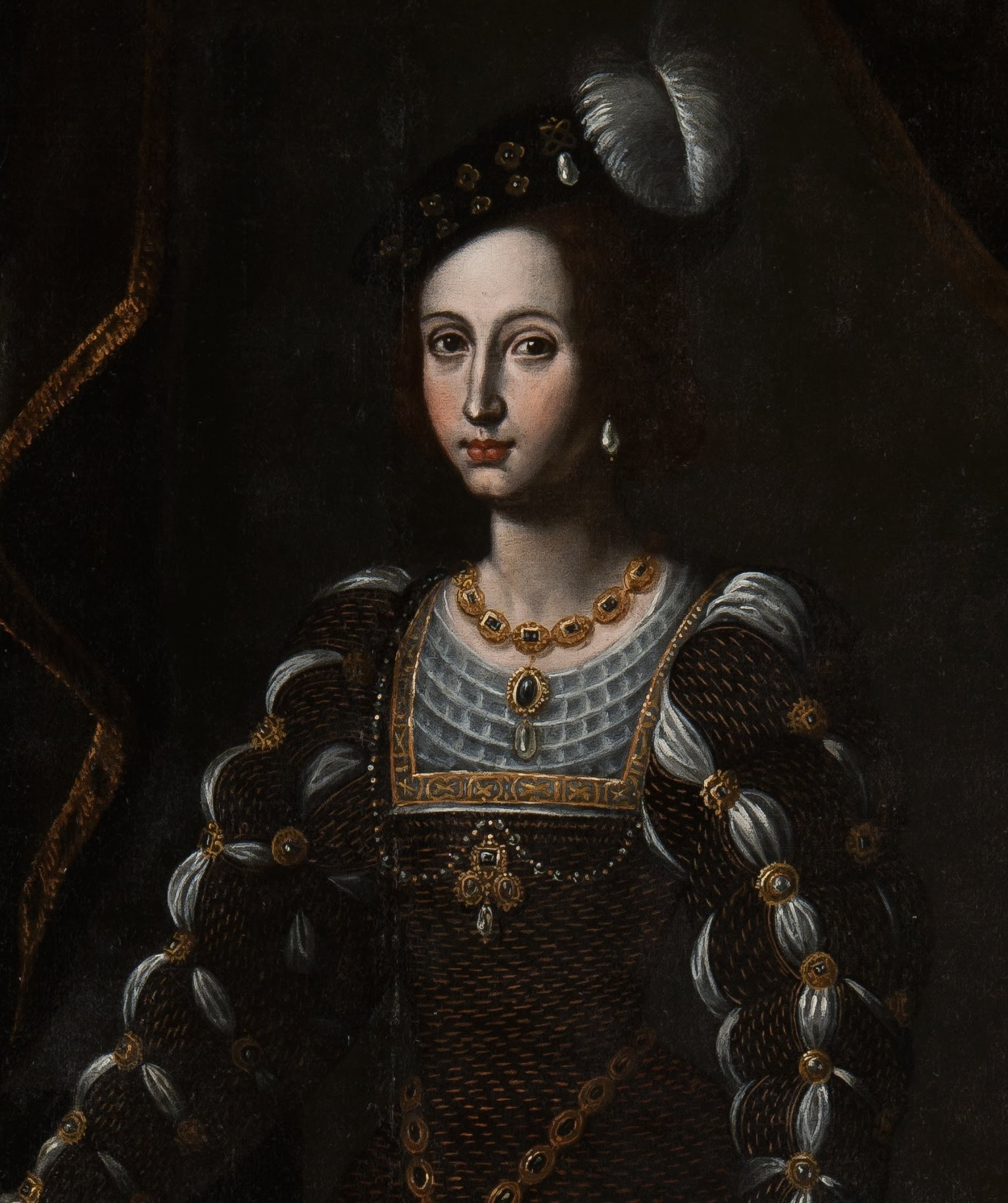

Duchess consort of Savoy
- Tenure: 29 September 1521 – 8 January 1538

Countess of Asti
- Reign: 3 April 1531 – 8 January 1538
- Predecessor: Charles V
- Successor: Emmanuel Philibert
- Born: 31 December 1504; Lisbon, Portugal
- Died: 8 January 1538 (aged 33); Nice, Savoy
- Spouse: Charles III of Savoy
- Issue: Emmanuel Philibert, Duke of Savoy
- House: Aviz (by birth); Savoy (by marriage)
- Father: Manuel I of Portugal
- Mother: Maria of Aragon

Infanta Beatrice of Portugal (Portuguese: Beatriz [bi.ɐˈtɾiʃ]; 31 December 1504 – 8 January 1538) was a Portuguese princess by birth and a Duchess of Savoy by marriage to Duke Charles III of Savoy. She was the ruling countess of Asti from 1531 to 1538.

== Life ==
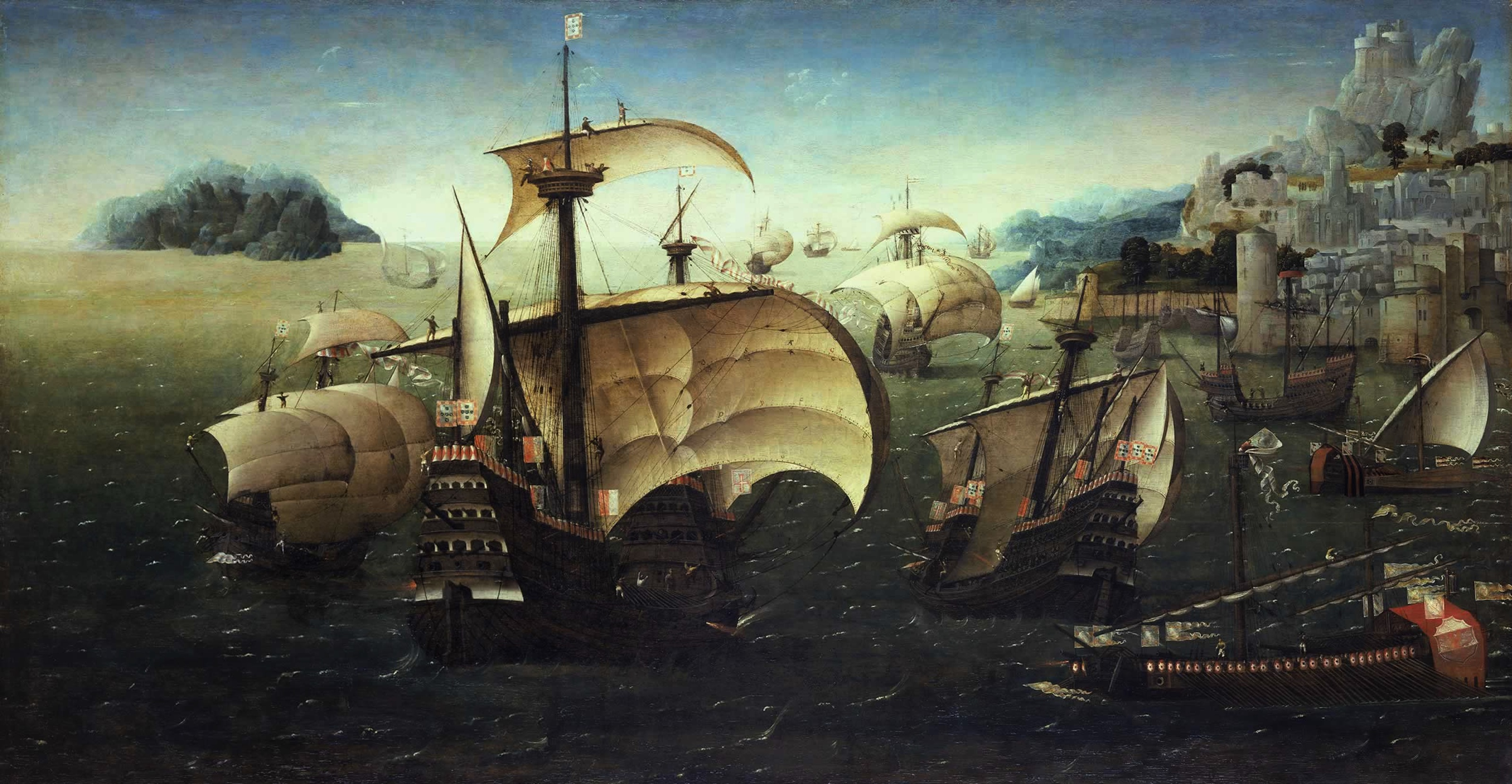
The famed carrack Santa Catarina do Monte Sinai, and other Portuguese ships. From painting, attributed to either Gregório Lopes or Cornelis Antoniszoon, showing the voyage of the Portuguese Infanta Beatrice to Savoy, 1521

She was the second daughter of Manuel I of Portugal (1469–1521) and his second wife, Maria of Aragon (1482–1517). Her siblings included King John III of Portugal and Isabella, Holy Roman Empress. She was educated under the supervision of her governess Elvira de Mendoza, a trusted favorite and confidante of the queen.

In Villefranche-sur-Mer on 29 September 1521, Beatrice married Duke Charles III of Savoy. He had succeeded as the duke of Savoy in 1504, making Beatrice duchess at the moment of her wedding.

Beatrice was described as beautiful, brilliant, and ambitious. In 1531, she received the County of Asti as a fiefdom from her cousin and brother-in-law, Emperor Charles V, which on her death was inherited by her son and permanently included in the Savoys' heritage.

In 1534, she welcomed Christina of Denmark, a ward of her brother-in-law the Emperor, on her way to her marriage with the Duke of Milan. When Christina was widowed in 1535, the Milanese Count Stampa suggested a marriage between Christina and the eldest son of Beatrice, Louis, the heir of Savoy, in an attempt to protect Milan from Imperial sovereignty. Beatrice supported the plan, and when Louis died, she suggested that her next son could replace him. Nothing more was heard of this, however. In April 1536, Beatrice fled from the French conquest of Savoy to Christina in Milan in the company of two of her surviving children and the Shroud of Turin from Chambéry. In May, she was able to visit the Emperor with Christina in Pavia, but without any political result. She then lived as a guest with Christina in Milan, with whom she was good friends. In November 1537, Beatrice was escorted by the Imperial viceroy of Milan to the Emperor in Genoa, but again, the meeting was without any result. She continued to Nice, where she reunited with her spouse. She died in Nice in January 1538.

=== Children ===
Beatrice and Charles III had nine children, but only one of them lived to adulthood:

- Adrian Jordan Amadeus, Prince of Piedmont (19 November 1522 – 10 January 1523), died in infancy.
- Louis, Prince of Piedmont (4 December 1523 – Madrid, 25 November 1536), died in childhood.
- Emmanuel Philibert (Chambéry, 8 July 1528 – Turin, 30 August 1580); only surviving child and later Duke of Savoy
- Catherine (25 November 1529 – May 1536), died in childhood.
- Marie (12 June 1530 – 1531), died in infancy.
- Isabella (May 1532 – 24 September 1533), died in early childhood.
- Emmanuel (born and died May 1533)
- Emmanuel (born and died May 1534)
- Gianmaria (3 December 1537 – 8 January 1538), died in infancy.

After the death of the childless Sebastian of Portugal (her grand-nephew), her son fought for his rights to become King of Portugal; however, he failed and the throne was given to Isabella's son Philip.

== Ancestry ==
Ancestors of Beatrice of Portugal, Duchess of Savoy

8. Edward, King of Portugal
4. Ferdinand, Duke of Viseu
9. Eleanor of Aragon
2. Manuel I of Portugal
10. John, Constable of Portugal
5. Beatrice of Portugal
11. Isabel of Barcelos
1. Beatrice of Portugal
12. John II of Aragon
6. Ferdinand II of Aragon
13. Juana Enríquez
3. Maria of Aragon
14. John II of Castile
7. Isabella I of Castile
15. Isabella of Portugal

== See also ==
- Descendants of Manuel I of Portugal

== Bibliography ==
- Cartwright Ady, Julia (1913). Christina of Denmark, Duchess of Milan and Lorraine, 1522-1590. New York: E.P. Dutton and Company. OCLC 871060.
- Prestage, Edgar: Il Portogallo nel medioevo, in: Cambridge University Press - Storia del mondo medievale, vol. VII, pp. 576–610, Garzanti, 1999.
- Ricaldone, Aldo di, Annuari del Monferrato, Vol I and II.
- Testa D., Storia del Monferrato, seconda edizione ampliata, Tip.S.Giuseppe 1951.
- Vergano L.: Storia di Asti, Vol. 1,2,3. Tip.S.Giuseppe Asti, 1953, 1957.

Beatrice of Portugal, Duchess of Savoy House of Aviz Cadet branch of the House of Burgundy Born: 31 December 1504 Died: 8 January 1538
Royal titles
Vacant Title last held by Margaret of Austria	Duchess consort of Savoy; 29 September 1521 – 8 January 1538	Vacant Title next held by Margaret of France
