= Elvira de Mendoza =

Spanish and Portuguese Court Official

Elvira de Mendoza (d. 1523) was a Spanish and Portuguese court official.

She was the daughter of the nobleman Juan Furtado de Mendoza, chief forester of Ferdinand and Isabella, and married Martin de Alarcon, captain of the guard to the king and queen of Castile. As a widow, she accompanied Maria of Aragon on her marriage to the king of Portugal in 1500 as her lady-in-waiting. She became a trusted favorite and confidante of the queen and was awarded a pension of 200,000 reis in 1508.

After the queen's death, Elvira was appointed aia (nurse) to the princesses Isabella and Beatrice. Upon the arrival of the new queen, Eleanor of Austria, she was appointed her lady-in-waiting and became her trusted companion. She had an influential position at court and had her son João de Alarcão appointed royal grand master of the hunt in 1521.

She accompanied the widowed Eleanor back to Castile in 1523, and died shortly after.
