= Joanna of Austria, Princess of Portugal =

Infanta of Spain, Archduchess of Austria and Princess of Portugal

Joanna of Austria
- Princess of Portugal
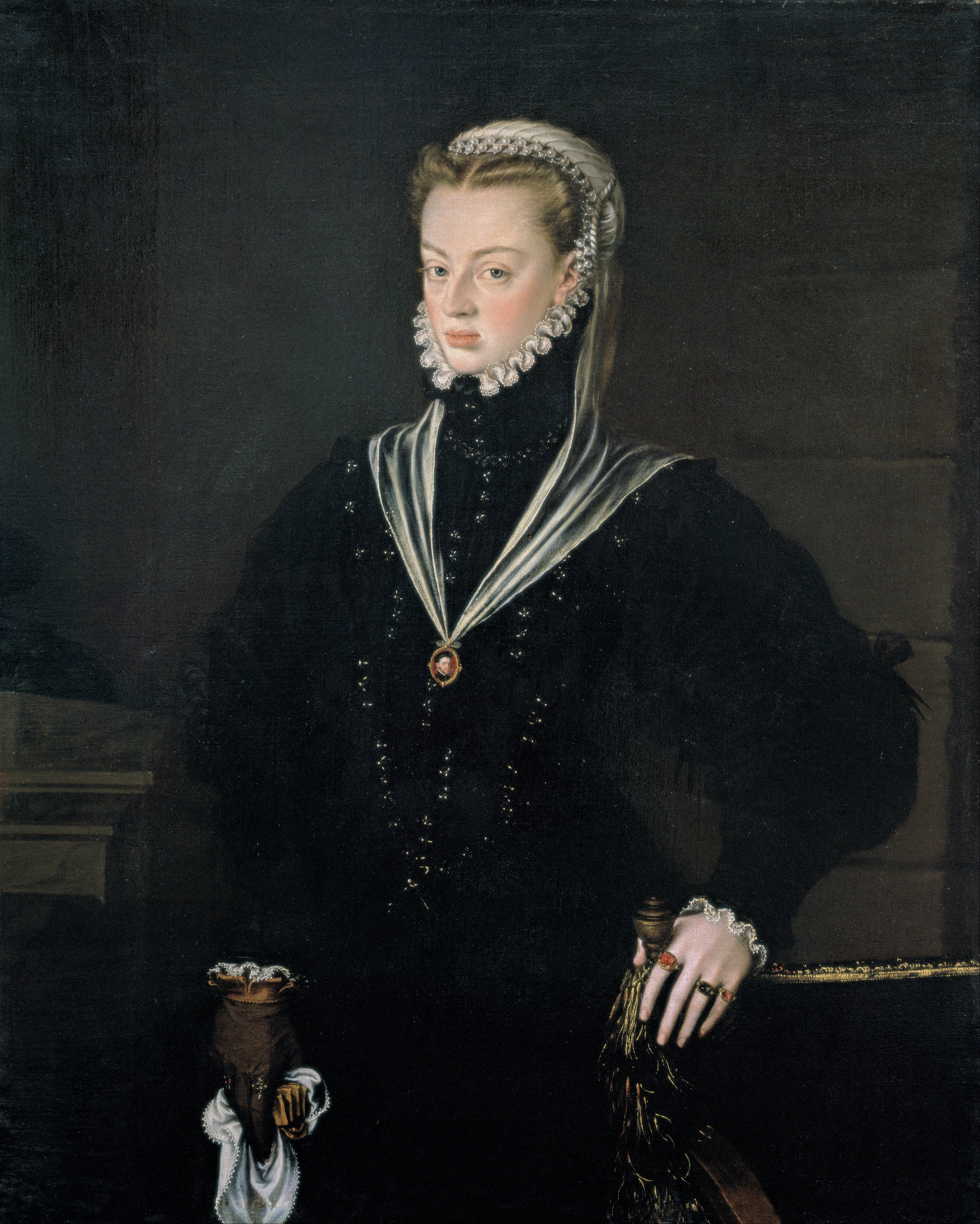
- Portrait by Alonso Sánchez Coello, c. 1557
- Born: 24 June 1535; Madrid, Crown of Castile, Spain
- Died: 7 September 1573 (aged 38); El Escorial, Crown of Castile, Spain
- Burial: Convent of Las Descalzas Reales
- Spouse: John Manuel, Prince of Portugal (m. 1552; died 1554)
- Issue: Sebastian of Portugal
- House: Habsburg
- Father: Charles V, Holy Roman Emperor
- Mother: Isabella of Portugal

Joanna of Austria (Spanish: Doña Juana de Austria; in Portuguese, Dona Joana de Áustria; 24 June 1535 – 7 September 1573) was an Infanta of Spain by birth and Princess of Portugal by marriage to João Manuel, Prince of Portugal. She served as regent of Spain for her brother Philip II during his trips to England to marry Mary I from 1554 to 1556, and 1556 to 1559. She was the mother of King Sebastian of Portugal.

Married at 16 to her even younger husband, Joanna was widowed after two years, giving birth in the same month to her only child. Later that year Joanna returned to Spain at her father's request, leaving her young son in the care of her mother-in-law, who was also her aunt. She never saw Sebastian again, but corresponded and had portraits sent. In later life Joanna was active in religious affairs.

== Life ==
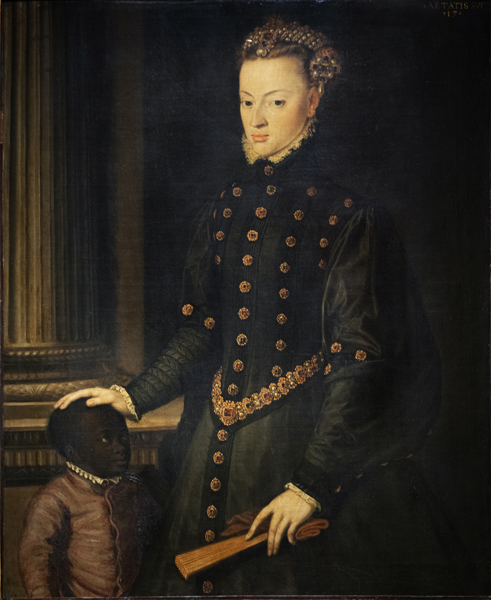
Joanna of Austria, Princess of Portugal; by Cristóvão de Morais, 1551.

=== Early years ===
Born in Madrid, Joanna was the daughter of Charles V, Holy Roman Emperor, who was the first king of united Spain, officially King of Aragon and King of Castile and his wife, Isabella of Portugal. Therefore, her paternal grandparents were Philip of Castile and Joanna of Castile, and her maternal grandparents were Manuel I of Portugal and Maria of Aragon. She was the sister of King Philip II of Spain and Maria of Austria.

Among others, Joanna held the titles of Archduchess of Austria, Infanta of Castile and of Aragon, and princess of Burgundy.

Named for the saint's day of her birth (24 June is the Nativity of St. John the Baptist) and in honour of her paternal grandmother, Queen Joanna of Castile, Joanna of Austria was motherless at the age of four and was entrusted to Doña Leonor de Mascareñas. By age eight she could understand Latin and could play several musical instruments.

=== Princess of Portugal ===
On 11 January 1552, at the age of sixteen, Joanna married her double first cousin, the fourteen-year-old crown prince of Portugal, John Manuel of Portugal, by proxy in Toro. She arrived at the Portuguese court in November 1552.

The marriage was cut short when John Manuel died of tuberculosis at age sixteen on 2 January 1554. However, Joanna was pregnant by that time, and the future Portuguese king Sebastián I was born on 20 January 1554.

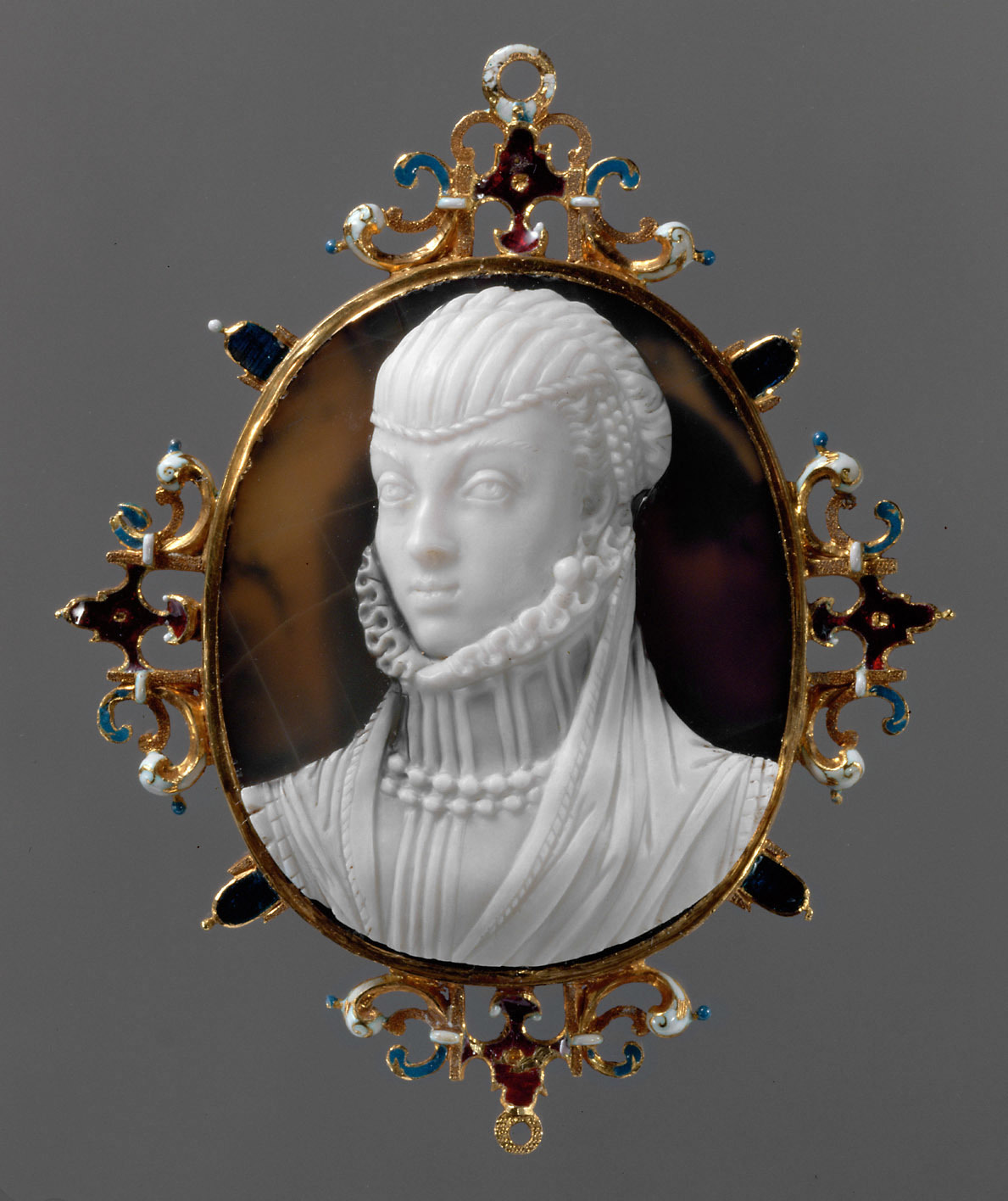
Cameo by Jacopo da Trezzo of Joanna, 1566

Joanna returned to Spain in May 1554 at the request of her father, leaving her newborn son with her mother-in-law, the Portuguese Queen Catherine of Austria, who was Charles V's youngest sister.

=== Regent of Spain ===
Shortly after Sebastian's birth, Joanna was called back to Madrid by her brother Philip to act as regent during his absence in England from 1554. She filled this role with intelligence and efficiency. Joanna never remarried and never returned to Portugal. She never saw her son Sebastian again, although she sent him letters and had portraits of him painted at various ages so she could see what he looked like.

In 1557, Joanna founded the Convent of Our Lady of Consolation (Nuestra Señora de la Consolación) for the nuns of the order of Poor Clares, also known as Discalced Clarisses (in Spanish, clarisas descalzas) because they did not wear covered shoes, and only walked either barefoot or in sandals, now known as the Convent of Las Descalzas Reales, or convent of the royal barefoot females, partly due to her affiliation and that the convent continued to attract aristocratic women as nuns. This convent is now a national monument and holds an art collection. It was founded in the royal palace where Joanna was born and where Charles V had lived when in Madrid.

Joanna repeatedly intervened in favour of the new order of the Jesuits, founded by Ignatius of Loyola. In 1555, she is reputed to have been admitted surreptitiously to the male-only Jesuit order under the name of a pseudonym, Mateo Sánchez. She corresponded with both Ignatius and Francis Borgia.

== Arms ==
Coat of arms of Joanna of Austria before her marriage

Coat of arms of Joanna of Austria after her marriage

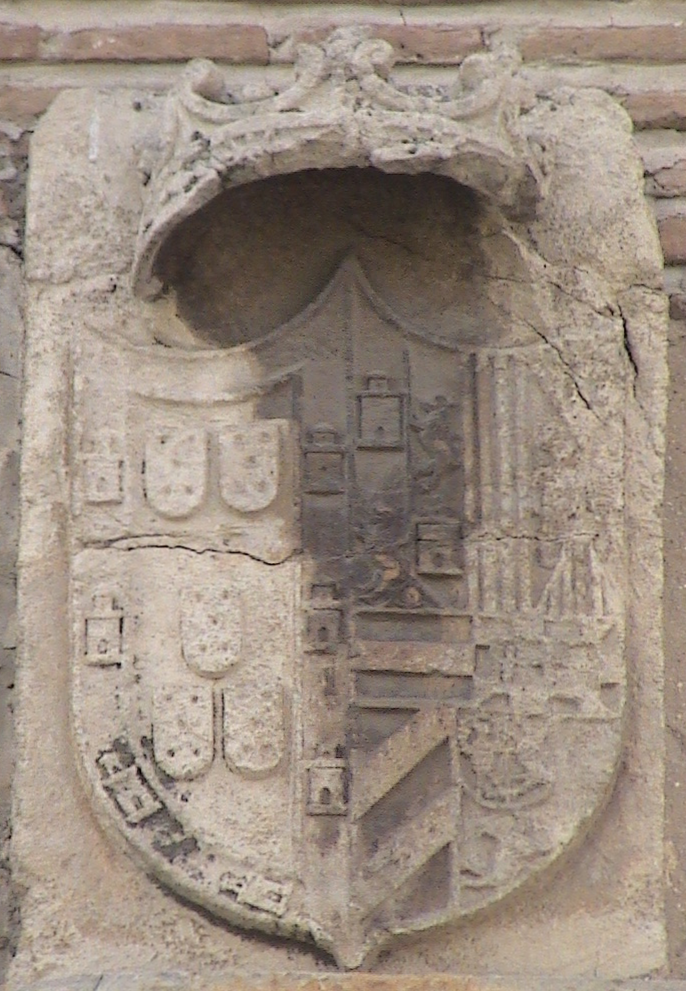
Coat of arms of Joanna of Austria on Real Colegio de San Agustín of Alcalá de Henares.

== Ancestry ==
Ancestors of Joanna of Austria, Princess of Portugal

8. Maximilian I, Holy Roman Emperor
4. Philip I of Castile
9. Mary, Duchess of Burgundy
2. Charles V, Holy Roman Emperor
10. Ferdinand II of Aragon (= 14)
5. Joanna I of Castile
11. Isabella I of Castile (= 15)
1. Archduchess Joanna of Austria
12. Ferdinand, Duke of Viseu
6. Manuel I of Portugal
13. Beatrice of Portugal
3. Isabella of Portugal
14. Ferdinand II of Aragon (= 10)
7. Maria of Aragon
15. Isabella I of Castile (= 11)
