= Convent of Las Descalzas Reales =

Convent of las Descalzas Reales
- Monasterio de las Descalzas Reales (Spanish)
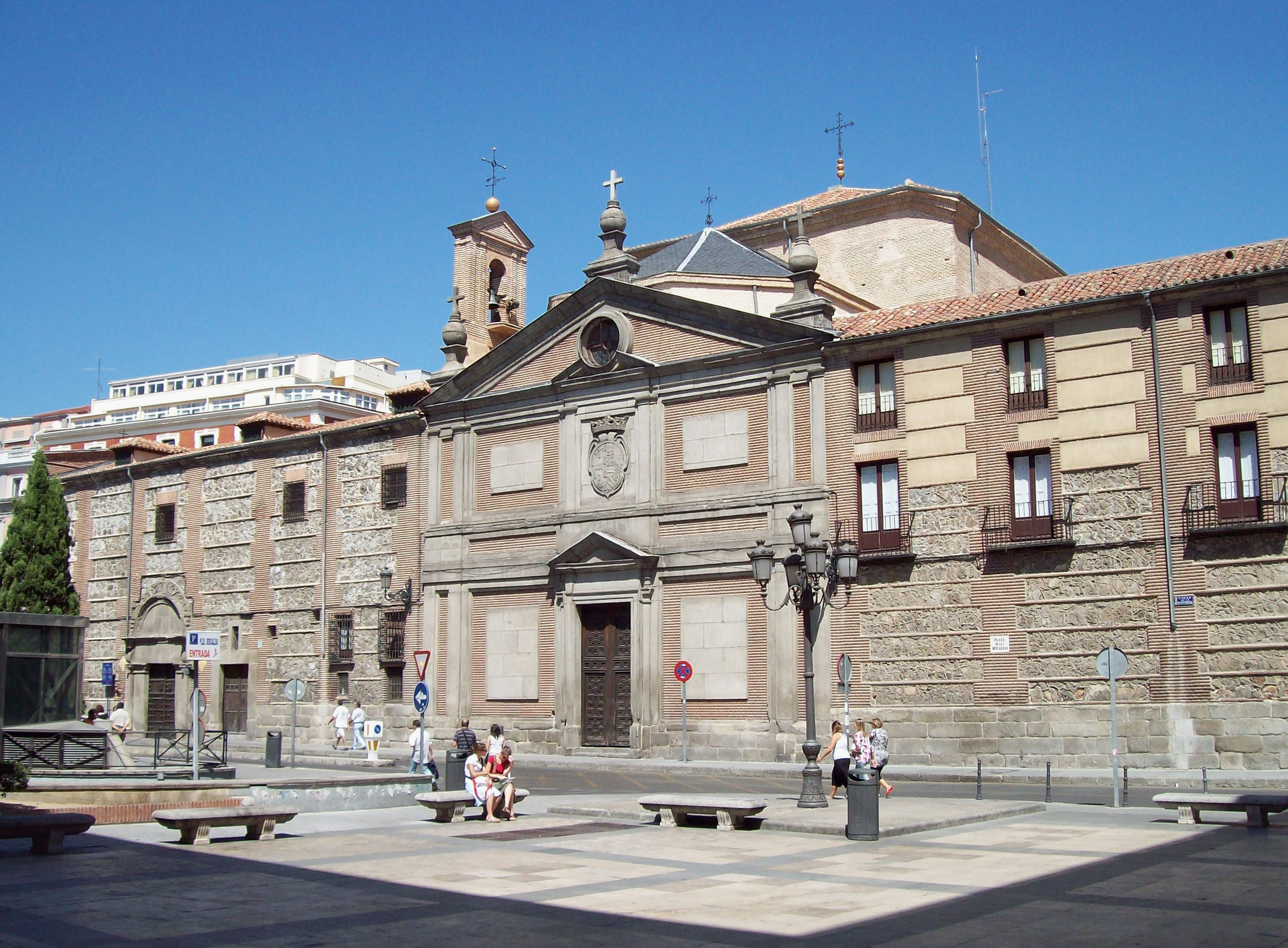

- Location within Spain
- 40.418267°N 3.706192°W
- Location: Madrid, Spain

Spanish Cultural Heritage
- Official name: Monasterio de las Descalzas Reales
- Type: Non-movable
- Criteria: Monument
- Designated: 1994
- Reference no.: RI-51-0008691

The Convent of Las Descalzas Reales (Spanish: Monasterio de las Descalzas Reales) is a royal monastery situated in Madrid, Spain, administered by the Patrimonio Nacional.

== History ==
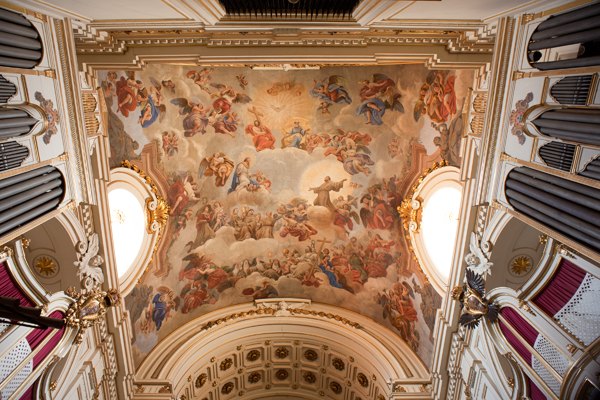
The church

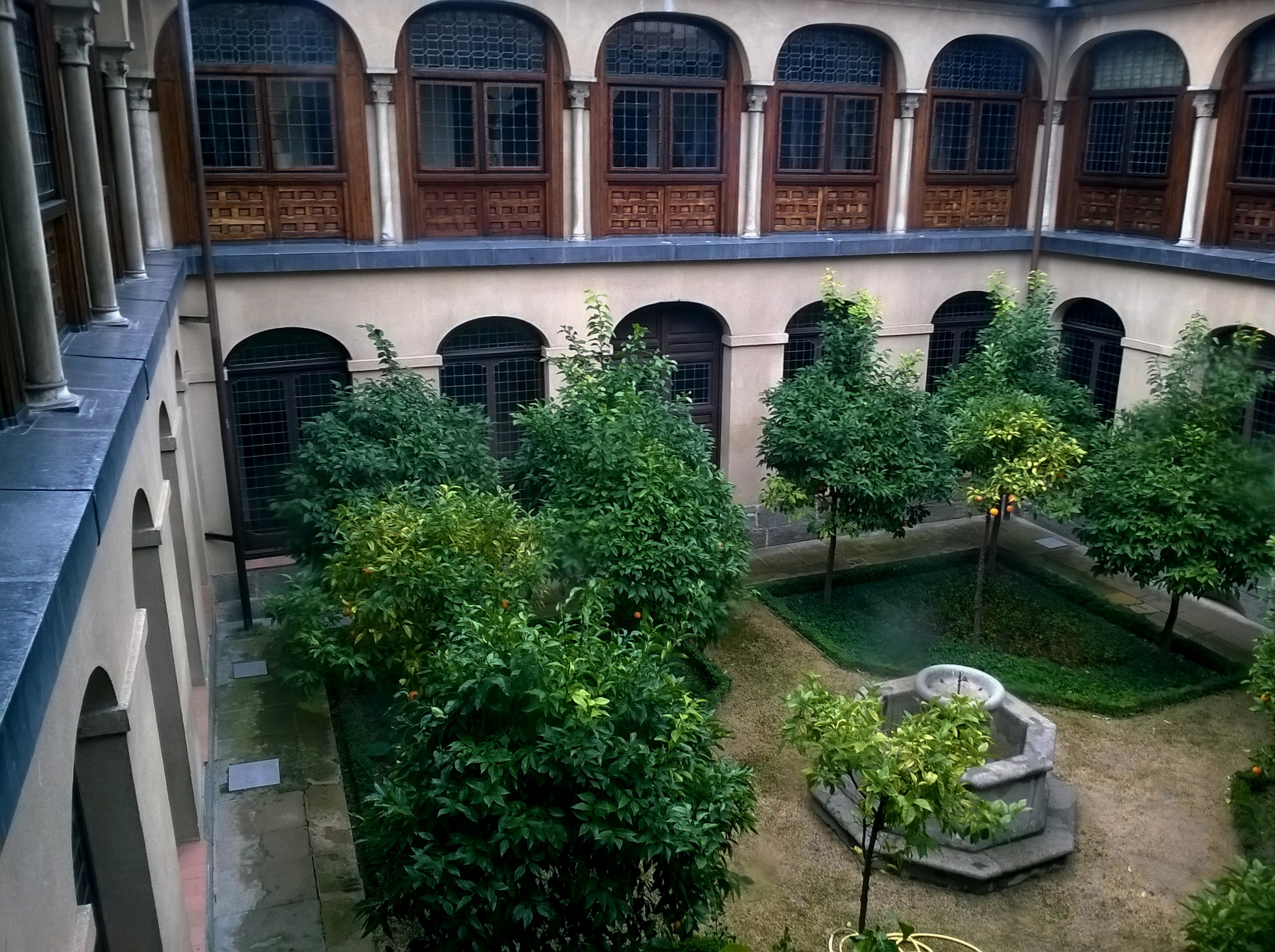
Cloister

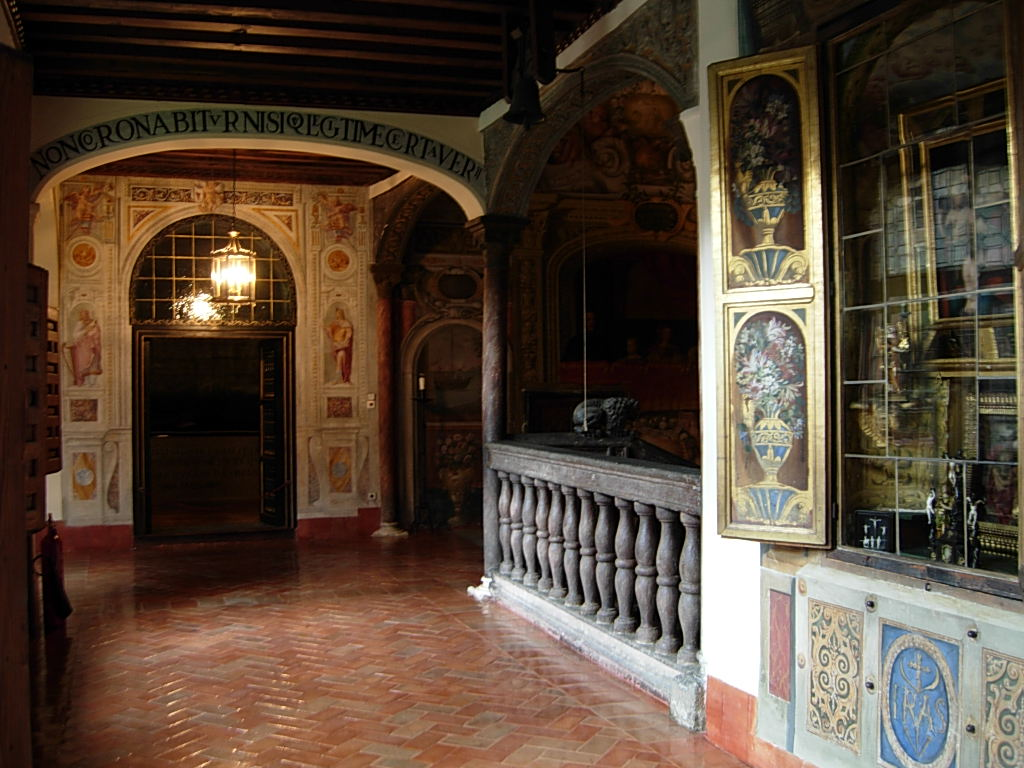
Paintings in the cloister

The Monasterio de las Descalzas Reales, literally the "Monastery of the Royal Discalced", resides in the former palace of Emperor Charles V and Empress Isabel of Portugal. Their daughter, Joanna of Austria, founded this convent of nuns of the Poor Clare order in 1559 and was eventually buried here. Throughout the remainder of the 16th century and into the 17th century, the convent attracted young widowed or spinster noblewomen. Each woman brought with her a dowry. The riches quickly piled up, and the convent became one of the richest convents in all of Europe. Tomás Luis de Victoria, Spain's finest Renaissance composer, worked at the convent from 1587 to the end of his life in 1611.

The demographics of the convent slowly changed over time, and by the 20th century, all of the sisters were in poverty. The convent maintained the riches of its past, but it was forbidden to auction any of the items off or spend any of the money it received from the dowries. The state intervened when it saw that the sisters were poor, and the pope granted a special dispensation to open the convent as a museum in 1960.

Alfonso, Duke of Anjou and Cádiz (died 1989) is buried in the Chapel of Saint John the Baptist next to his elder son Francisco de Asís (died 1984). Alfonso's younger brother Gonzalo (died 2000) is buried in the Chapel of Saint Sebastian.

== Museum ==
While in the past, the treasures of the monastery were not visible, today the monastery houses only a few nuns, and the site is a well-visited national monument. The noblewomen's dowries were often invested into relics and their bejeweled exhibition pieces. Among the many relics on display are putatively pieces from Christ's cross and the bones of Saint Sebastian. Among the priceless art masterpieces are Titian's Caesar's Money, tapestries woven to designs by Rubens, and works by Hans de Beken and Brueghel the Elder.

The museum collection also includes such rarities as portraits of royal children of the Polish–Lithuanian Commonwealth from the late 16th century, referring to Polish–Spanish relations that inspired Calderón's La vida es sueño. Portraits of the son and daughter of King Sigismund of Poland were painted by Martin Kober in 1596 and were sent as a gift to King Philip III of Spain.

== The Church ==
The original architect of the church was Antonio Sillero. The facade was designed by Juan Bautista de Toledo in 1559; who also helped in the roofing of the church. Parts of the altar, choir, and sacristy, were designed by Juan Gómez de Mora in 1612. Gaspar Becerra in 1562 completed the main retablo of the altar, which was considered his master work. Unfortunately, this retablo was destroyed by fire in 1862, along with many of the paintings and frescoes by Juan Pantoja de la Cruz. In 1863 the altar was replaced by one commissioned in 1716 by Philip V of Spain to commemorate the beatification of the French Jesuit John Francis Regis, including canvases by Michel-Ange Houasse. It has a sculpted relief of the Apotheosis of Juan Francisco Régis, by Camillo Rusconi. The lateral panels were sculpted by Jose Bellver. The recumbent statue of the Jesuit was sculpted by Agostino Cornacchini. A chapel contains the marble statue of Joanna of Austria at prayer, by either Pompeo Leoni or Crescenci.
