= João Manuel, Prince of Portugal =

Prince of Portugal (1537–1554)

João Manuel
- Hereditary Prince of Portugal
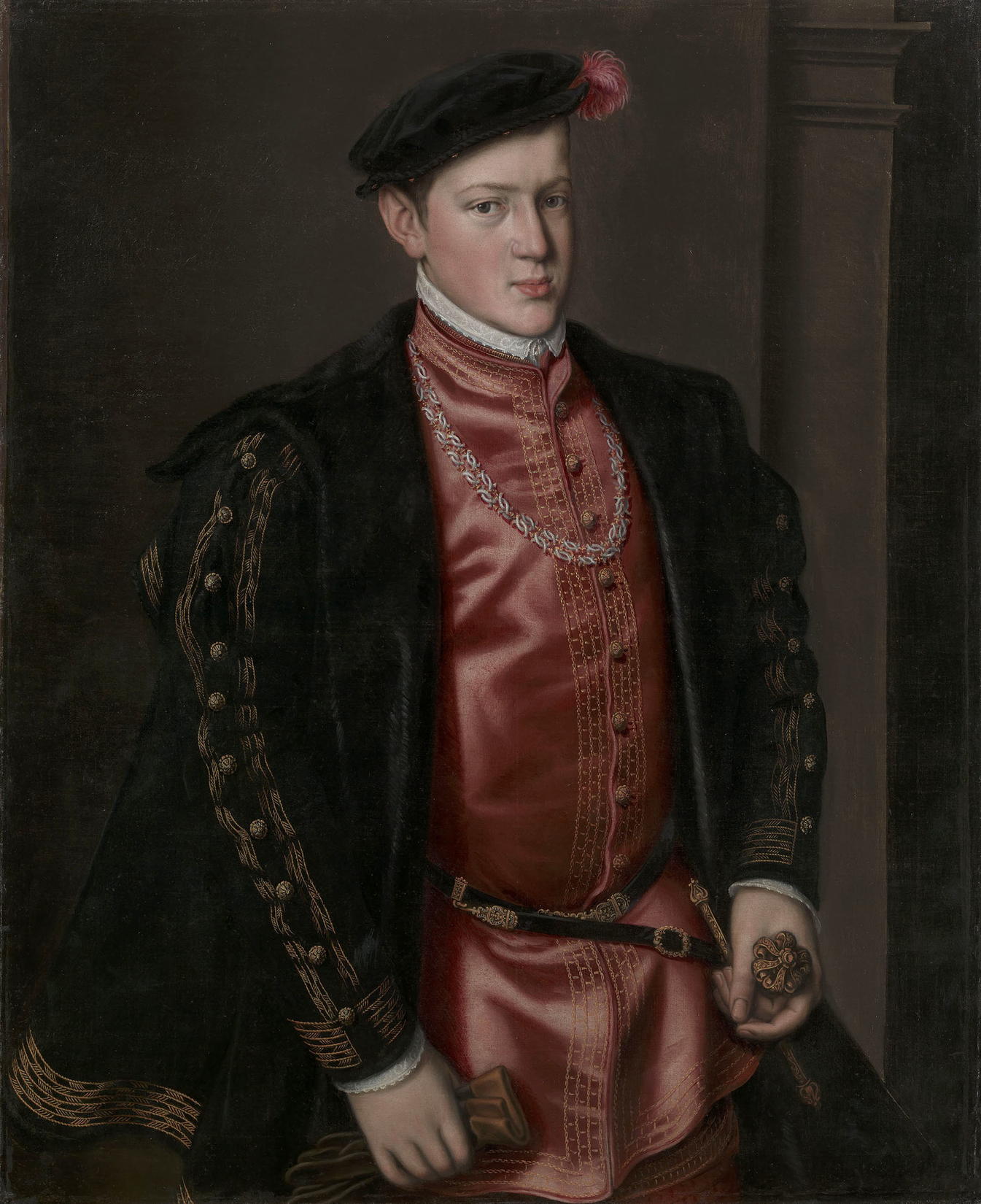
- João, Prince of Portugal; Antonis Mor, 1552
- Born: 3 June 1537; Royal Palace of Évora, Évora
- Died: 2 January 1554 (aged 16); Ribeira Palace, Lisbon
- Burial: Jerónimos Monastery
- Spouse: Joanna of Austria (m. 1552)
- Issue: Sebastian, King of Portugal
- House: Aviz
- Father: John III of Portugal
- Mother: Catherine of Austria

Dom João Manuel, Hereditary Prince of Portugal or John Emmanuel(Portuguese pronunciation: [ʒuˈɐ̃w mɐnuˈɛl]) (3 June 1537 – 2 January 1554) was a Portuguese infante (prince), the eighth child of King John III of Portugal and Catherine of Austria, daughter of Philip I of Castile and Joanna of Castile. As the heir to the throne, he was styled Prince of Portugal.

== Early life ==
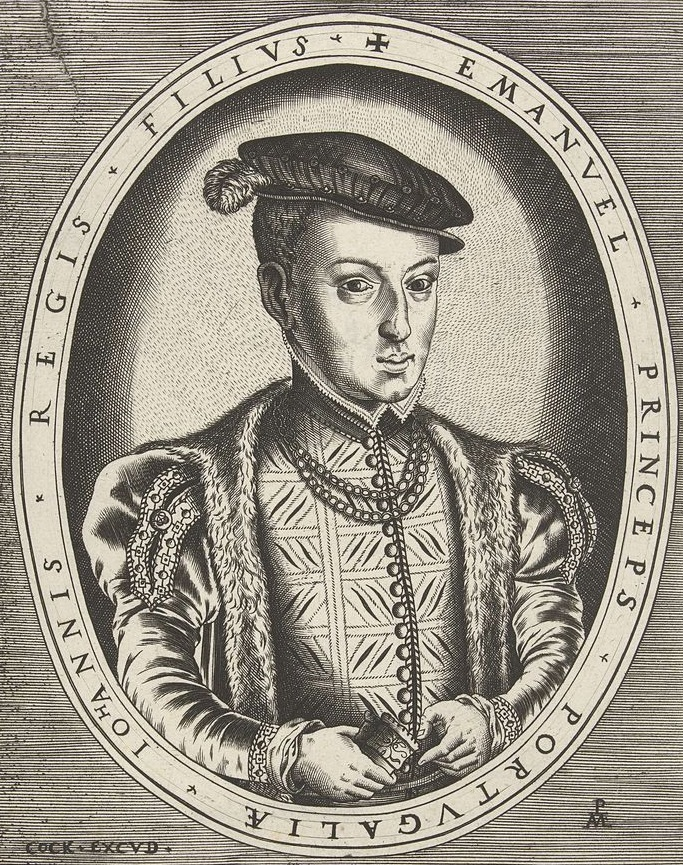
Portrait of Prince João Manuel; Hieronymus Cock, c. 1550–1554

João Manuel was born on 3 June 1537 in the Royal Palace of Évora and became the heir to the throne of Portugal in 1539. He survived his four older brothers who died in childhood but was a sickly teenager. The successive inter-marriages between the houses of Spain and Portugal are believed to have some responsibility for his ill health.

On 11 January 1552, he married Princess Joanna of Spain, his double-first cousin, through both paternal and maternal line, daughter of his paternal aunt Isabella of Portugal and of his maternal uncle, Emperor Charles V.

== Death ==
João Manuel died of what the sources refer to as consumption, the old term used to refer to tuberculosis, on 2 January 1554, but some historians believe his death occurred as a result of diabetes, a disease inherited from his maternal grandfather, Philip I. 18 days later, a posthumous son was born, who later became Sebastian I of Portugal.

== Ancestry ==
Ancestors of João Manuel, Prince of Portugal

8. Ferdinand, Duke of Viseu
4. Manuel I of Portugal
9. Beatrice of Portugal
2. John III of Portugal
10. Ferdinand II of Aragon
5. Maria of Aragon
11. Isabella I of Castile
1. João Manuel, Hereditary Prince of Portugal
12. Maximilian I, Holy Roman Emperor
6. Philip I of Castile
13. Mary, Duchess of Burgundy
3. Catherine of Austria
14. Ferdinand II of Aragon (= 10)
7. Joanna I of Castile
15. Isabella I of Castile (= 11)

João Manuel, Prince of Portugal House of Aviz Cadet branch of the House of Burgundy Born: 3 June 1537 Died: 2 January 1554
Portuguese nobility
Preceded by Philip	Prince of Portugal; 1539–1554	Succeeded by Sebastian
