= Philip, Hereditary Prince of Portugal =

Philip
- Hereditary Prince of Portugal
- Born: 25 March 1533; Évora, Kingdom of Portugal
- Died: 29 April 1539 (aged 6); Évora, Kingdom of Portugal
- House: Aviz
- Father: John III of Portugal
- Mother: Catherine of Austria

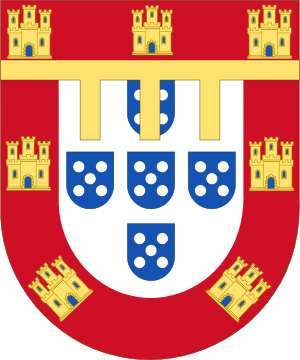
Coat of arms of the Prince of Portugal (1481-1910)

Philip (25 March 1533 – 29 April 1539) was the Hereditary Prince of Portugal from 1537 to his death in 1539. He was the sixth child and third son of king John III of Portugal and Catherine of Austria.

In 1537, he succeeded his brother Prince Manuel as Prince of Portugal, after his premature death. After Philip's own premature death two years later, after reaching six years old, his younger brother Infante João Manuel became the next Prince of Portugal.

== Ancestry ==
Ancestors of Philip, Hereditary Prince of Portugal

8. Ferdinand, Duke of Viseu
4. Manuel I of Portugal
9. Beatrice of Portugal
2. John III of Portugal
10. Ferdinand II of Aragon
5. Maria of Aragon
11. Isabella I of Castile
1. Filipe, Hereditary Prince of Portugal
12. Maximilian I, Holy Roman Emperor
6. Philip I of Castile
13. Mary, Duchess of Burgundy
3. Catherine of Austria
14. Ferdinand II of Aragon (= 10)
7. Joanna I of Castile
15. Isabella I of Castile (= 11)

Philip, Hereditary Prince of Portugal House of Aviz Cadet branch of the House of Burgundy Born: 25 March 1533 Died: 29 April 1539
Preceded by Manuel	Hereditary Prince of Portugal; 1537–1539	Succeeded by João Manuel
