= Portrait of Isabella of Portugal (Titian) =

1548 painting by Titian

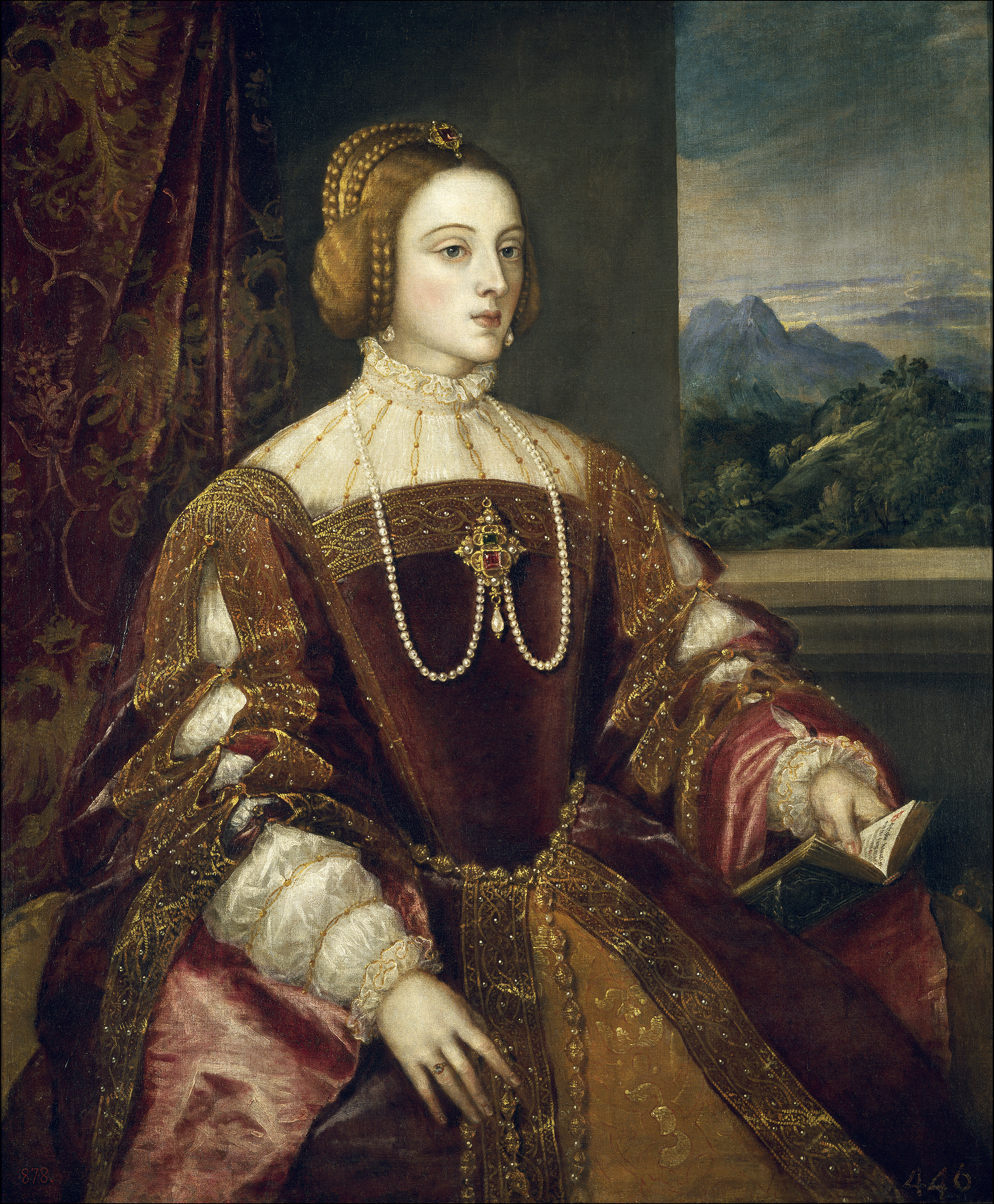
- Artist: Titian
- Year: 1548
- Medium: oil on canvas
- Dimensions: 117 cm × 98 cm (46 in × 39 in)
- Location: Museo del Prado, Madrid
- Website: Museo del Prado

The Portrait of Isabella of Portugal is an oil-on-canvas portrait of Isabella of Portugal, Holy Roman Empress by Titian dating to 1548. It was part of the Spanish royal collection and is now in the Museo del Prado, in Madrid.

== Description ==
The subject is Empress Isabella of Portugal (1503–1539), the beloved wife of Charles V, Holy Roman Emperor, mother of Philip II of Spain and daughter of Manuel I of Portugal. Titian painted her after her death, using a mediocre painting for reference. For the rest of his life, Charles took the painting with him on all his travels.

The portrait follows a classic scheme already used by Raphael and Leonardo da Vinci, in which the model sits next to a window opening on a landscape. The landscape gives depth to the composition, and its greenish and bluish tones provide a contrast to the interior scene dominated by warm colors. The figure shows some stiffness, possibly related to the concept of majesty as used in imperial iconography.

She wears a rich red dress and gold brocade and trimmed with rhinestones. It is decorated also with flashy jewelry: a necklace of pearls with a clasp at the chest with gems hanging from another teardrop pearl, a ring on her right hand, and a jewel-topped headdress. Her rigid hairstyle, very fashionable at the time, is made up with braids. The Empress holds an open book in her left hand, perhaps a missal or prayer book, and looks at a distant point with a distant expression.

== See also ==
- List of works by Titian
