= Isabella of Portugal =

Holy Roman Empress from 1530 to 1539

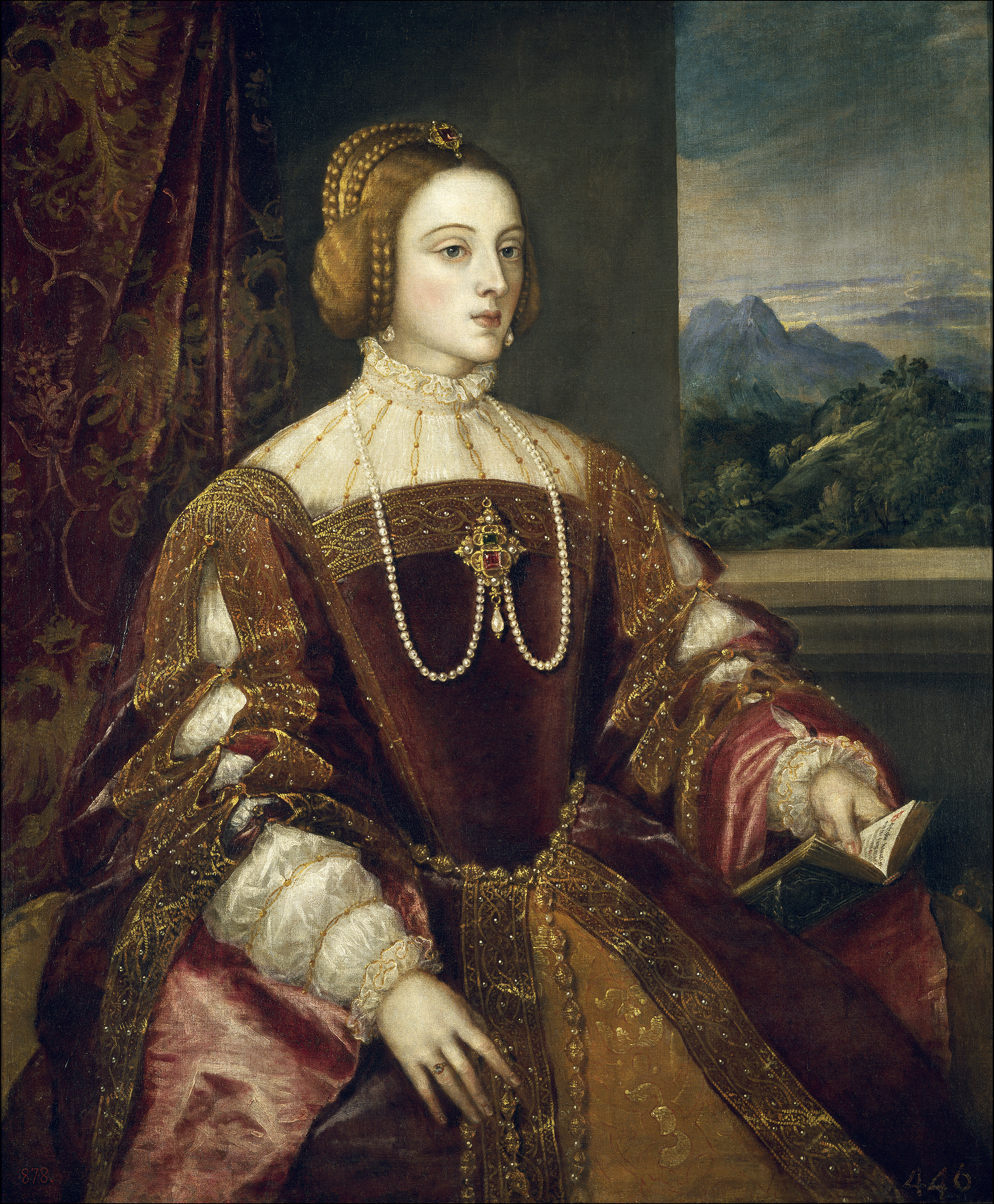
- Portrait of Isabella of Portugal by Titian, 1548

Holy Roman Empress
- Tenure: 24 February 1530 – 1 May 1539

Queen consort of Spain and Germany; Archduchess consort of Austria; Lady of the Netherlands
- Tenure: 10 March 1526 – 1 May 1539
- Born: 24 October 1503; Lisbon, Kingdom of Portugal
- Died: 1 May 1539 (aged 35); Toledo, Crown of Castile, Spain
- Burial: El Escorial
- Spouse: Charles V, Holy Roman Emperor (m. 1526)
- Issue Detail: Philip II, King of Spain; Maria, Holy Roman Empress; Joanna, Princess of Portugal
- House: Aviz
- Father: Manuel I of Portugal
- Mother: Maria of Aragon
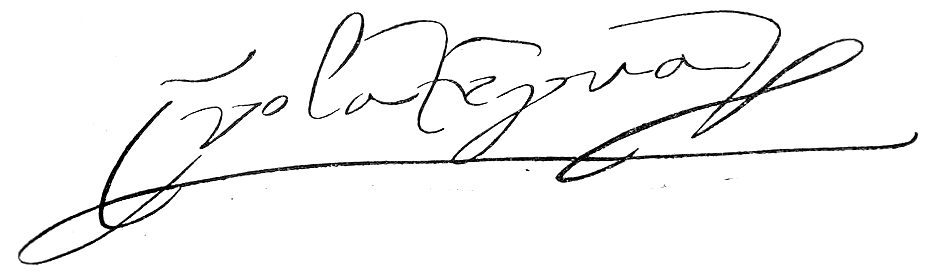
- Signature

Isabella of Portugal (Portuguese and Spanish: Isabel de Portugal; 24 October 1503 – 1 May 1539) was the empress consort of Charles V, Holy Roman Emperor, King of Spain, Archduke of Austria, and Duke of Burgundy. She was Queen of Spain and Germany, and Lady of the Netherlands from 10 March 1526 until her death in 1539, and became Holy Roman Empress and Queen of Italy in February 1530. She acted as regent of Spain during her husband's long absences.

== Childhood ==
Isabella was born in Lisbon on 24 October 1503 and named after her maternal grandmother (Isabella I). She was the second child and first daughter of King Manuel I of Portugal and his second wife, Maria of Aragon. Isabella was second-in-line to the throne until the birth of her brother Luis in 1506.

Isabella was educated under the supervision of her governess Elvira de Mendoza. Her studies included mathematics, Renaissance classics, the languages of Latin, Spanish and French besides her native Portuguese, etiquette, and Christian doctrine. Isabella and her siblings were punished by their mother, "when they deserved it, without pardoning any of them". At the age of 14, her mother died. She and her sister Beatrice inherited her properties, plus the income from Viseu and Torres Vedras.

== Engagement and marriage ==
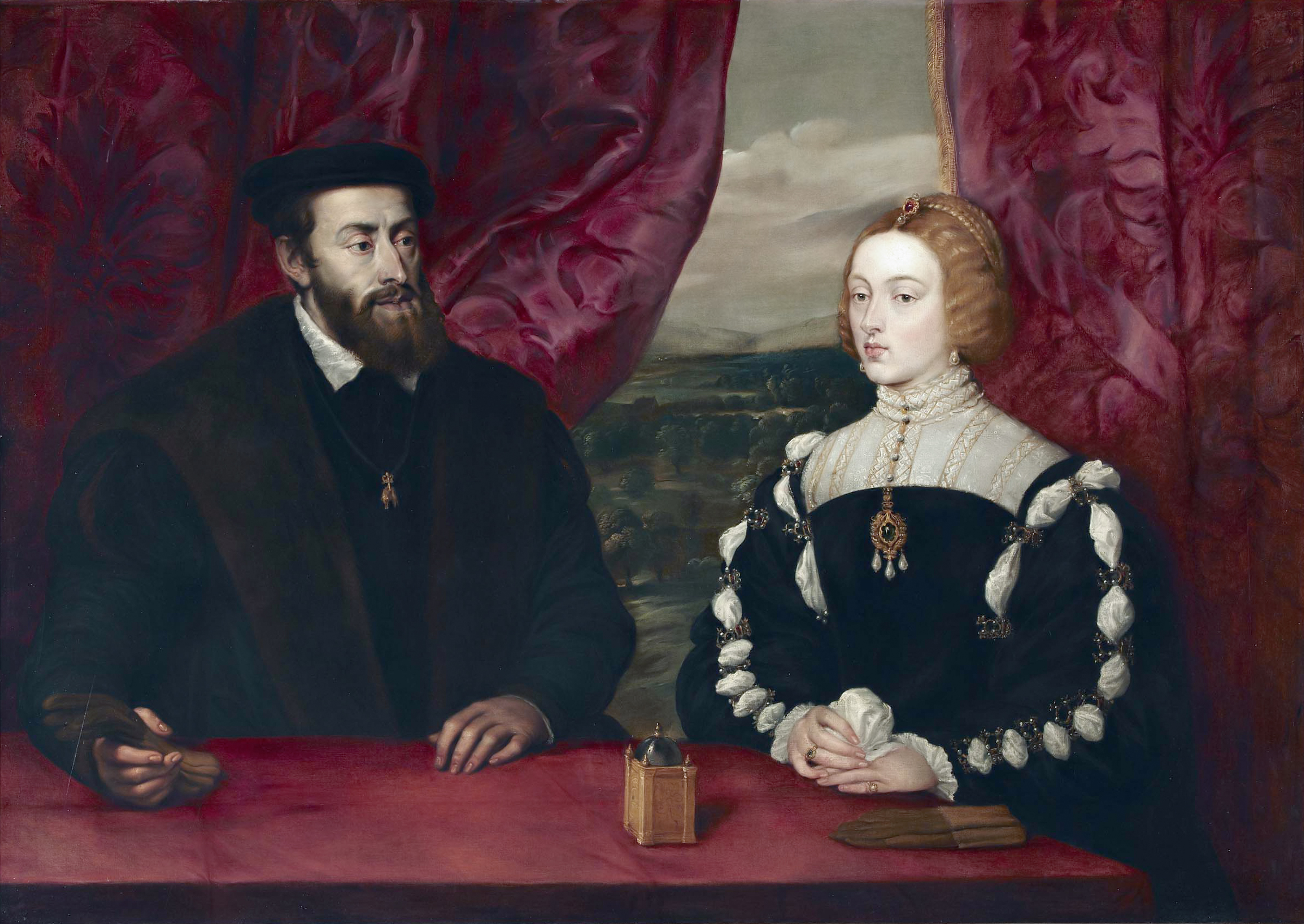
Emperor Charles V and Empress Isabella. Peter Paul Rubens after Titian, 17th century.

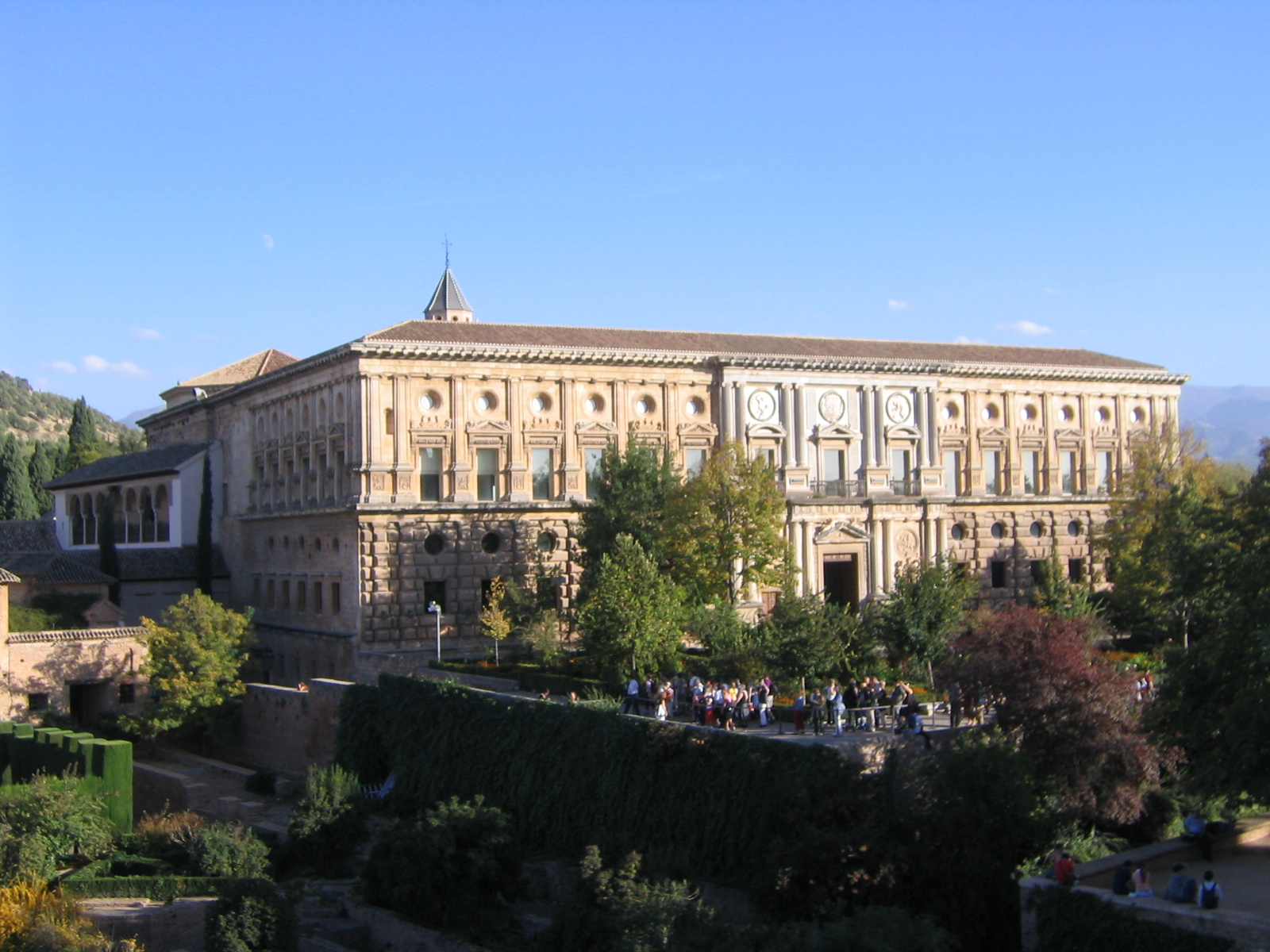
Exterior of The Palace of Charles V in Granada was built upon his wedding to Isabel of Portugal in 1526.

As the eldest daughter of Manuel the Fortunate, Isabella was a rather attractive candidate for marriage. The ideal candidate for her husband was her first cousin Charles, son of Maria's sister, Joanna I of Castile and her husband Philip, Duke of Burgundy. Their marriage would bring a strong alliance between Spain and Portugal, in accordance with the wishes of their grandparents, Isabella I of Castille and Ferdinand II of Aragón. It would also facilitate the continued exploration of the oceans without incurring clashes, as Portugal was the only naval power that could challenge Spain's supremacy in the Atlantic Ocean. Plus, as Charles was sovereign of multiple kingdoms, it was necessary that Portugal, Christendom's richest kingdom, would fall under Spain's orbit and not of France, which had happened in the War of Castilian Succession. Moreover, because he had been raised in Burgundy, the Spanish nobles and subjects reportedly insisted that he should marry a princess from the Iberian peninsula.

However, the 18-year-old Charles was in no hurry to marry and instead sent his sister Eleanor to marry Isabella's widowed father in 1518. Charles's Flemish advisors, especially William de Croÿ, later convinced him to relegate the Portuguese alliance to the background and replace it with an alliance with England. In 1521, Charles became engaged to his other first cousin, Mary Tudor, daughter of Henry VIII and Catherine of Aragon, who was 16 years younger than Charles and still a child. Their engagement sought to undo an alliance between England and France articulated by the ambitious Cardinal Thomas Wolsey. Many in Portugal took their Infanta's rejection as an offense, but Isabella remained determined she would marry her powerful cousin or enter a convent. By 1525, Charles was no longer interested in an alliance with England and could wait no longer for Mary to get older because he was determined to have legitimate children. His engagement was called off, the alliance with England was abandoned, and he finally sought to marry Isabella. There were many more advantages – she was closer to him in age (she was only 3 years his junior), fluent in Spanish, and offered a dowry of 900,000 Portuguese cruzados (or Castilian folds), which was more than enough to solve many of his financial problems brought on by the Italian War of 1521–26.

Charles wasted no time in securing a papal dispensation for first cousins and the marriage contract for an alliance with Portugal was made - Isabella would marry him and her brother, King John III of Portugal, would marry Charles' youngest sister, Catherine of Austria. Charles intended to wed and then leave his future wife as regent to govern Spain while he went to Central Europe to deal with political and religious troubles there. In January 1526, Isabella traveled to Spain. Upon her arrival, she met the Duke of Calabria, the Archbishop of Toledo and the Duke of Béjar at the Spanish-Portuguese border. They escorted her to Seville, where she would wait a week for Charles. In the end, their wedding took place the very next day just after midnight on 11 March in the Palace of Alcázar of Seville.

Although their marriage was political, Isabella captivated Charles, who tarried with her longer than anticipated. They honeymooned for several months at the Alhambra in Granada, where he ordered the seeds of a Persian flower that had never been seen before in Spain. The seeds eventually grew into red carnation, which delighted her. He then ordered thousands more to be planted in her honour, establishing the red carnation as Spain's floral emblem. Despite the mutual affection the couple shared, their marriage was not easy and Isabella struggled with Charles's long absences. His first absence lasted from 1529 to April 1533. He remained in Spain for 2 years, only to depart again in December 1536. Although he came back briefly in 1538, he left almost immediately, returning in November 1539. As agreed by the nobles, their children were raised in Spain. She supervised their education and taught them Portuguese. She wrote to her husband regularly but often spent months without receiving letters.

== Regency ==
Coat of arms of Isabella of Portugal as Empress

As Charles had planned, he appointed Isabella regent of Spain during his absence from the peninsula to lead his military campaigns and attend the administration of his other kingdoms between 1529–33 and 1537–39. She attended meetings of the governing councils, consulted regularly with ministers, and gradually assumed a more active role in policymaking, proposing her own solutions rather than merely accepting their recommendations. Throughout Charles's absences, she maintained regular correspondence with the emperor, informing him of political, military, and financial developments while receiving detailed instructions on imperial affairs. Her husband considered her deliberations "very prudent and well thought out".

As regent, Isabella presided over the royal councils, signed royal decrees in the king's name, supervised appointments to public offices, and oversaw matters relating to the administration of the Indies. With both civil and criminal jurisdiction, she appointed Diego López de Medrano as her mayordomo mayor (High Steward), entrusting him with the organization and governance of the royal household.

=== Economy ===
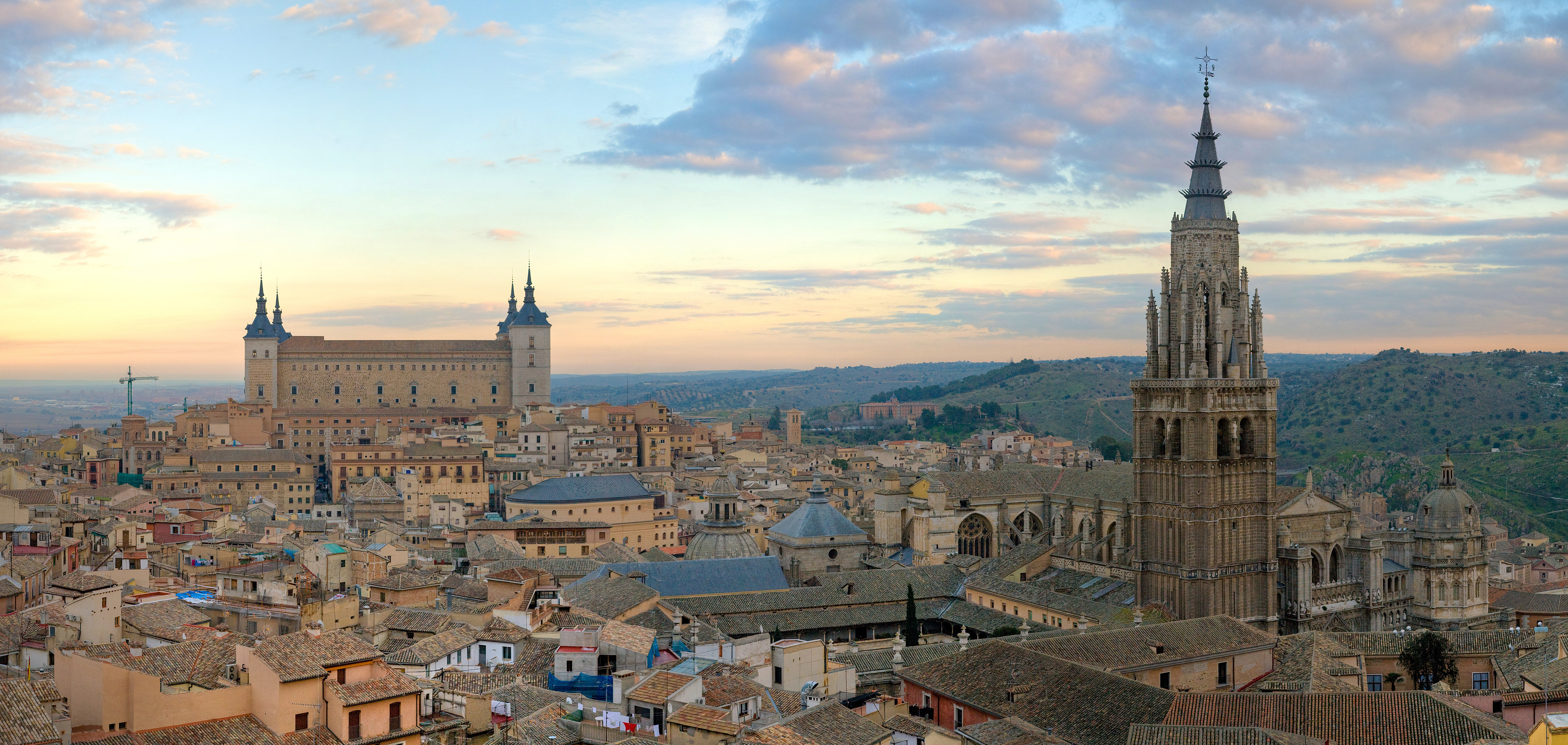
The city of Toledo served as the main revenue of the imperial court of Charles V in Castille.

Isabella demonstrated a thorough understanding of the affairs of the peninsular kingdoms. Her government also coordinated the defence of the Mediterranean and Atlantic coasts against Barbary corsair raids while supporting Charles V's campaigns in Italy and North Africa through the administration of the Spanish kingdoms. The security of maritime trade and the arrival of precious metals from the Americas contributed to the Crown's finances, while her prudent fiscal administration helped preserve the relative prosperity of Castile during her regencies. Following her death, however, Castile became increasingly burdened by the financial demands of Charles's imperial wars, contributing to mounting inflation and fiscal difficulties that culminated in the bankruptcies declared during the reign of Philip II.

=== Domestic and foreign relations ===
Isabella effectively defended the royal power in order to ensure the monarch's authority, as a response towards the previous rebellions against Charles for his foreign relationships. She traveled regularly in the autumn between Toledo, Valladolid, Seville, Barcelona, and Majorca. To deal with important matters of the empire, the couple wrote to each other more regularly. In foreign policy, Isabella actively intervened in the negotiations of marital alliances between the French and Spanish royal families. She was very concerned that her own children would not be forced to wed the much older offspring of King Francis I.

== Death ==
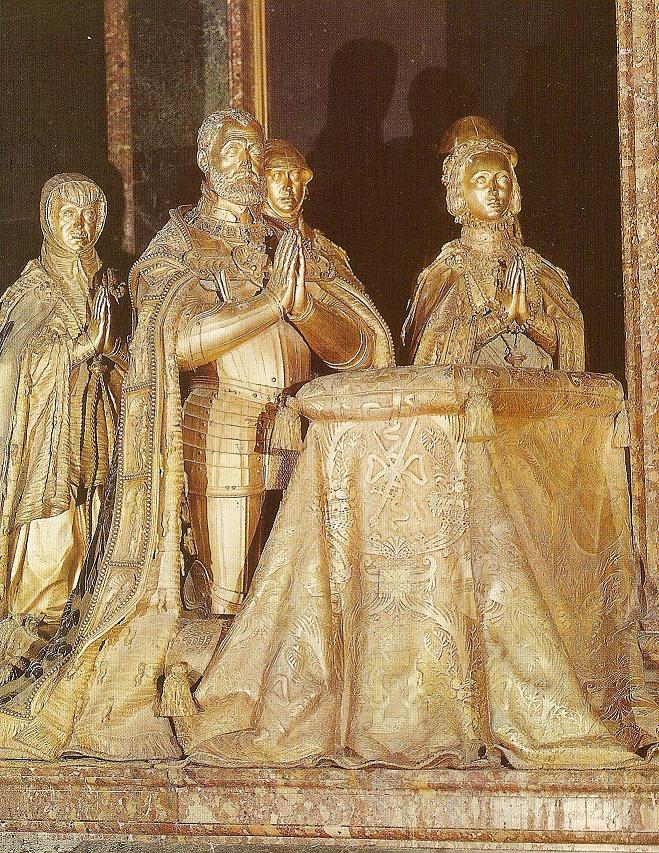
The bronze effigies of Charles and Isabella at the Basilica in El Escorial

During several years, Isabella and the court traveled from city to city, moving in part to avoid exposure to epidemics. There is speculation that she suffered from consumption, with a contemporary describing her: "The Empress is the greatest pity in the world, she is so thin that she does not resemble a person". In 1539, she became pregnant for the seventh time, but contracted another fever in the third month that caused antenatal complications and gave birth to a stillborn son. She died two weeks later on 1 May 1539 at the age of 35, without her husband present.

Charles was left so devastated that he could not bring himself to accompany his wife's body to the Royal Chapel of Granada, the burial place of the Catholic Monarchs. He instead instructed their son Philip to accompany his mother's body with Francis Borgia, 4th Duke of Gandía. Decomposition had so disfigured Isabella's body, however, that Gandía could not recognize her and was allegedly so horrified at what death had done to her beauty that he later became a Jesuit, gaining fame as San Francisco de Borja. Charles was so grief-stricken by her death that he shut himself in a monastery for 2 months, praying and mourning for her in solitude. He never recovered from her death and wore black for the rest of his life to show his mourning. He never remarried, though he had an affair long after her death that resulted in the birth of an illegitimate son, John of Austria. Charles died as a widower in 1558 while holding the same cross in his hand which she held in her hand when she died.

In 1574, Isabella's body was transferred by her son to the Royal Monastery of San Lorenzo de El Escorial, where she was originally interred into a small vault along with her husband directly underneath the altar of the Royal Chapel. This was done in accordance with his last will and testament, in which he left a codicil asking for the establishment of a new religious foundation in which the couple would be reburied together side by side, "half-body under the altar and half under the priest's feet". They remained in the Royal Chapel while the famous Basilica of the Monastery and the Royal Crypt were still under construction. In 1654, after the Basilica and Royal Crypt were finally completed during the reign of their great-grandson Philip IV, the couple's remains were moved into the Royal Pantheon of Kings, which lies directly under the Basilica. On one side of the Basilica are bronze effigies of Charles and Isabella, with effigies of their daughter Maria of Austria and Charles's sisters, Eleanor of Austria and Maria of Hungary, behind them. Exactly adjacent to them on the opposite side of the Basilica are effigies of their son with three of his wives and their ill-fated grandson Carlos, Prince of Asturias.

== Post-mortem tributes ==
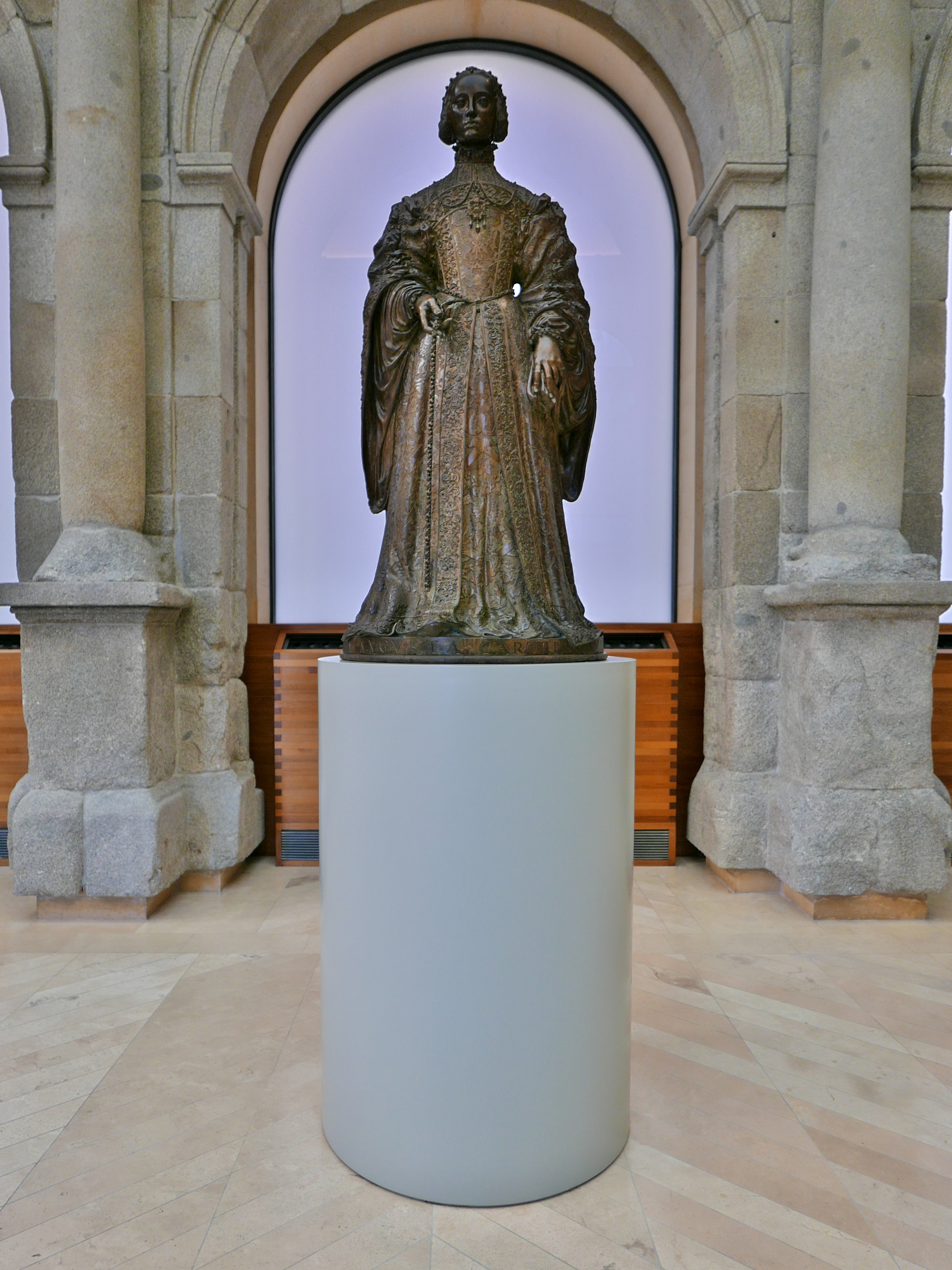
The bronze statue of Empress Isabella by Leone Leoni, 1550–1555, that was commissioned by Charles V, on display at the El Prado Museum, Madrid

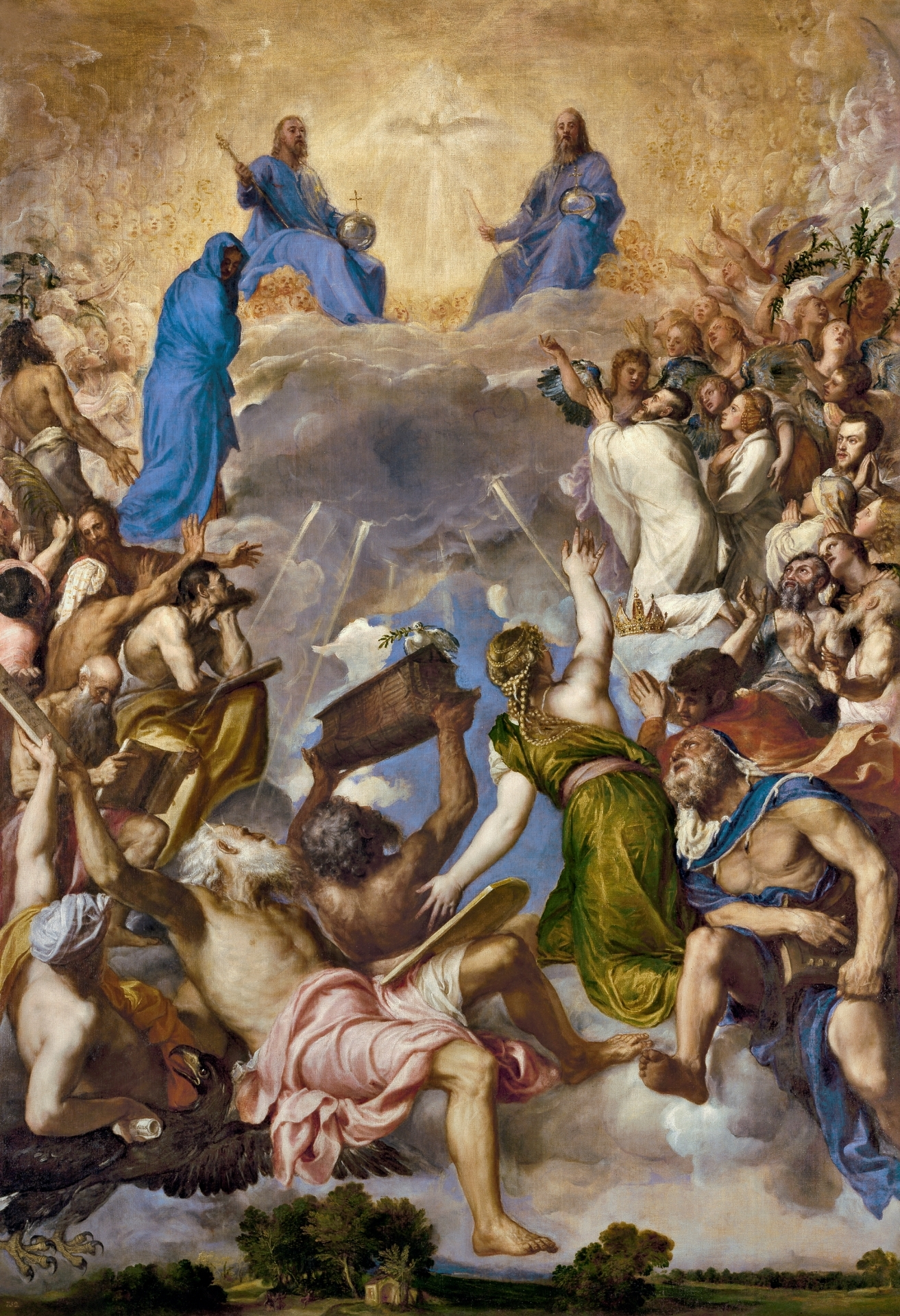
Titian's La Gloria, one of the several paintings commissioned by Charles V in memory of his wife Isabella

In memory of Isabella, Charles commissioned several tributes through art and music, beginning in 1540 when he commissioned the Flemish composer Thomas Crecquillon to compose new music in honour of the empress. Crecquillon composed his Missa Mort m'a privé as a memorial to her, which expresses her husband's grief and wish for a heavenly reunion with his beloved wife. Another musical tribute to her is Carole cur defles Isabellam that was composed in 1545 by the Franco-Flemish composer Nicolas Payen.

In 1543, Charles commissioned his favourite painter Titian to paint posthumous portraits of Isabella by using earlier ones of her as his model. Titian painted several portraits of her, which included his Portrait of Isabella of Portugal and La Gloria. He later painted a double portrait of the imperial couple together, of which there is a copy by Peter Paul Rubens. Charles kept these portraits with him whenever he travelled and after he retired to the Monastery of Yuste in 1555.

== Issue ==
Isabella had seven children with Charles, of whom three survived, including King Philip II of Spain and Maria, who became Holy Roman Empress when she married Maximilian II, Holy Roman Emperor.

Name	Portrait	Lifespan	Notes
Philip II of Spain		21 May 1527 – 13 September 1598	Only surviving son, successor of his father in the Spanish crown. As grandson of Manuel I of Portugal, Phillip claimed the Portuguese throne after the death of Henry, the Cardinal-King in 1580, establishing the Iberian Union.
Maria		21 June 1528 – 26 February 1603	Married her first cousin Maximilian II, Holy Roman Emperor.
Ferdinand		22 November 1529 – 13 July 1530	Died in infancy.
Son		29 June 1534	Stillborn.
Joanna		26 June 1535 – 7 September 1573	Married her first cousin João Manuel, Prince of Portugal.
Juan		19 October 1537 – 20 March 1538	Died in infancy.
Son		21 April 1539	Miscarried and stillborn.

== Ancestry ==
Ancestors of Isabella of Portugal

8. Edward I of Portugal
4. Ferdinand, Duke of Viseu
9. Eleanor of Aragon
2. Manuel I of Portugal
10. John, Constable of Portugal
5. Beatrice of Portugal
11. Isabel of Barcelos
1. Isabella of Portugal
12. John II of Aragon
6. Ferdinand II of Aragon
13. Juana Enríquez
3. Maria of Aragon
14. John II of Castile
7. Isabella I of Castile
15. Isabella of Portugal

== Cultural depictions ==
Isabella of Portugal is portrayed by Blanca Suárez in the TVE series Carlos, Rey Emperador.

== See also ==
- Descendants of Isabella I of Castile and Ferdinand II of Aragon
- Descendants of Manuel I of Portugal

Isabella of Portugal House of Aviz Cadet branch of the House of Burgundy Born: 24 October 1503 Died: 1 May 1539
Royal titles
Vacant Title last held by Bianca Maria Sforza	Holy Roman Empress; Queen consort of Italy; 1530–1539	Vacant Title next held by Maria of Austria
Vacant Title last held by Bianca Maria Sforza	Queen of the Romans; Archduchess consort of Austria; 1526–1539 with Anne of Bohemia and Hungary (1531–39)	Succeeded by Anne of Bohemia and Hungary
Vacant Title last held by Joan of Portugal	Queen consort of Castile and León; 1526–1539	Vacant Title next held by Mary I of England
Vacant Title last held by Germaine of Foix	Queen consort of Aragon, Majorca, Valencia, Naples and Sicily; Countess consort of Barcelona; 1526–1539	Vacant Title next held by Mary I of England
Vacant Title last held by Joanna of Castile	Lady of the Netherlands; 1526–1539	Vacant Title next held by Mary I of England
