= Casa degli Omenoni =

Palace in Milan, Italy

Coordinates: 45°28′2.18″N 9°11′30.78″E

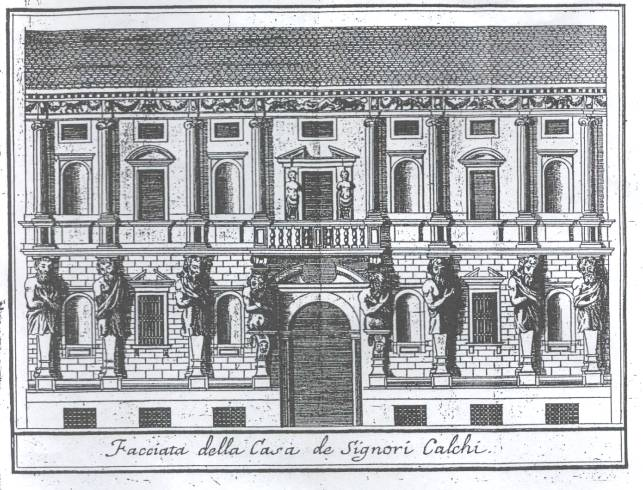
Casa degli Omenoni in an engraving from Serviliano Lattuada, Descrizione di Milano ornata con molti disegni, Milan 1738. The caption reads: "Facade of the house of the Calchi"

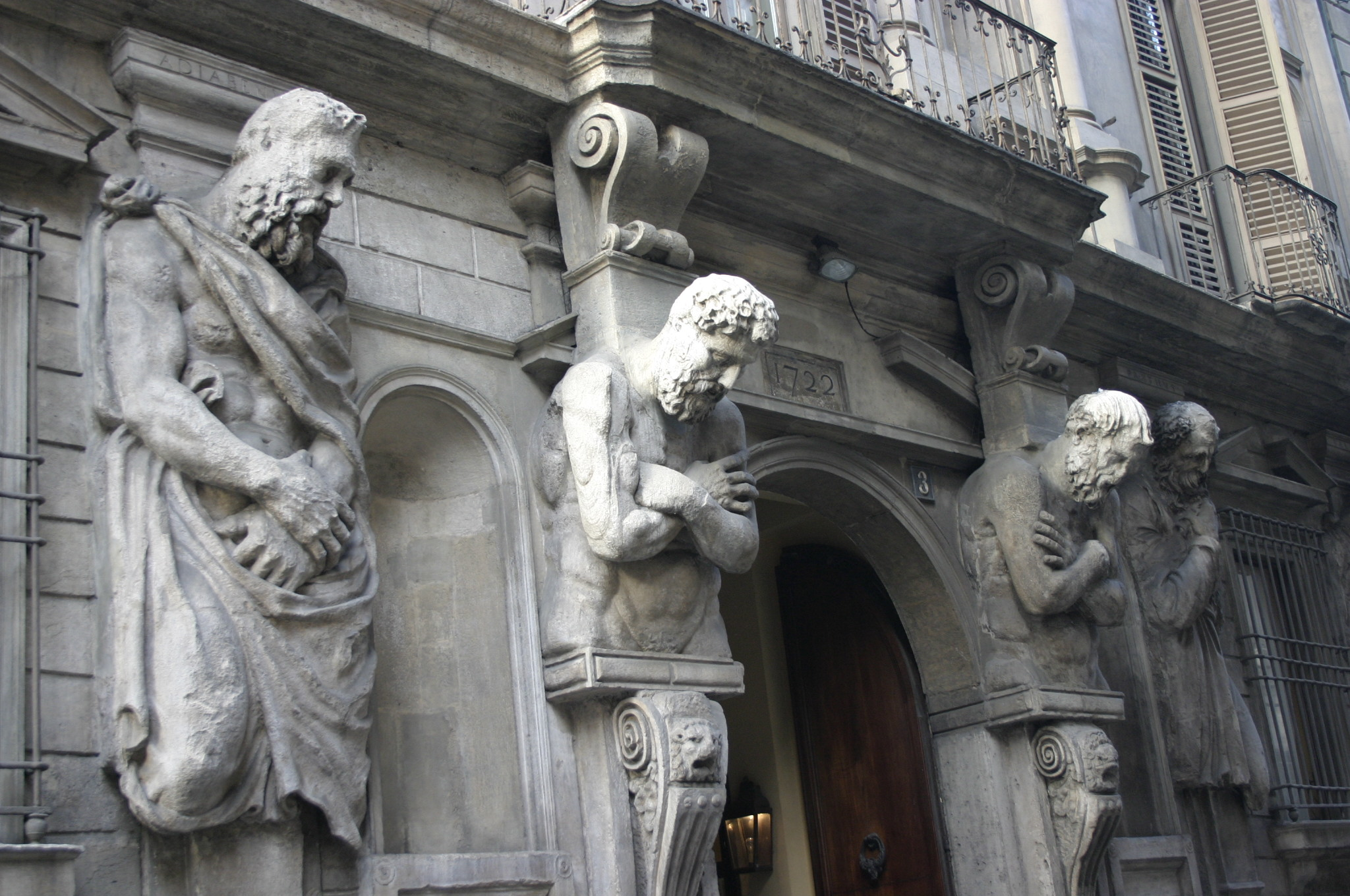
The "Omenoni" (atlantes)

Casa degli Omenoni is a historic palace of Milan, northern Italy, located in the eponymous street of Via degli Omenoni (number 3). It was designed by sculptor Leone Leoni for himself; he both lived and worked there. It owes its name to the eight atlantes decorating its facade, termed "omenoni" ("big men" in Milanese), which were sculpted by Antonio Abondio, most probably on a design by Leoni. Lions (a reference to the "Leoni" family) are a recurring theme of its decorations; in particular, a large relief placed under the cornice depicts two lions tearing a satyr into pieces. The overall style of the palace and the decorations have been noted to include several references to the art of Michelangelo. The internal courtyard, modified in 1929 by Piero Portaluppi, has a colonnade with metopes and triglyphs.

Artist and historian Giorgio Vasari expressed his admiration for the palace, stating that it was pieno [...] di capricciose invenzioni ("full of capricious inventions"). At the time, the palace also housed a notable collection of art works and antiquities, which has been dispersed over time. According to an inventory dating back to 1615, it had paintings by Titian, Parmigianino, and Michelangelo; the inventory also mentions a book of drawings by Leonardo da Vinci, which scholars identify with the Codex Atlanticus now preserved in the Biblioteca Ambrosiana.

The palace has been largely restored and restructured in the 19th and 20th century; only the facade has remained almost unchanged, except for the addition of iron balconies and of the attic.

After being owned by Leone Leoni and then by his son Pompeo Leoni, the house was sold by Pompeo's son-in-law Polidoro Calchi, and over time was owned by several notable Milanese families, including the Belgioioso, the Pozzi, and the Besana. It was also used as the seat of the music-publishing company Casa Ricordi, as a seat of the Fascist party, and as a theatre. The building is adjacent to the Palazzo Pozzi Besana.

== See also ==
- Villas and palaces in Milan
