= Besana =

Besana may refer to:

- Besana (surname), a surname
- Besana in Brianza, a town and comune in the province of Monza and Brianza, northern Italy.
- Besana Group, an Italian company
- Palazzo Pozzi Besana, a Neoclassical style palace in Milan, Italy
- Rotonda della Besana, a late baroque building complex and former cemetery in Milan, Italy,
