= Studies of the Fetus in the Womb =

Two drawings by Leonardo da Vinci

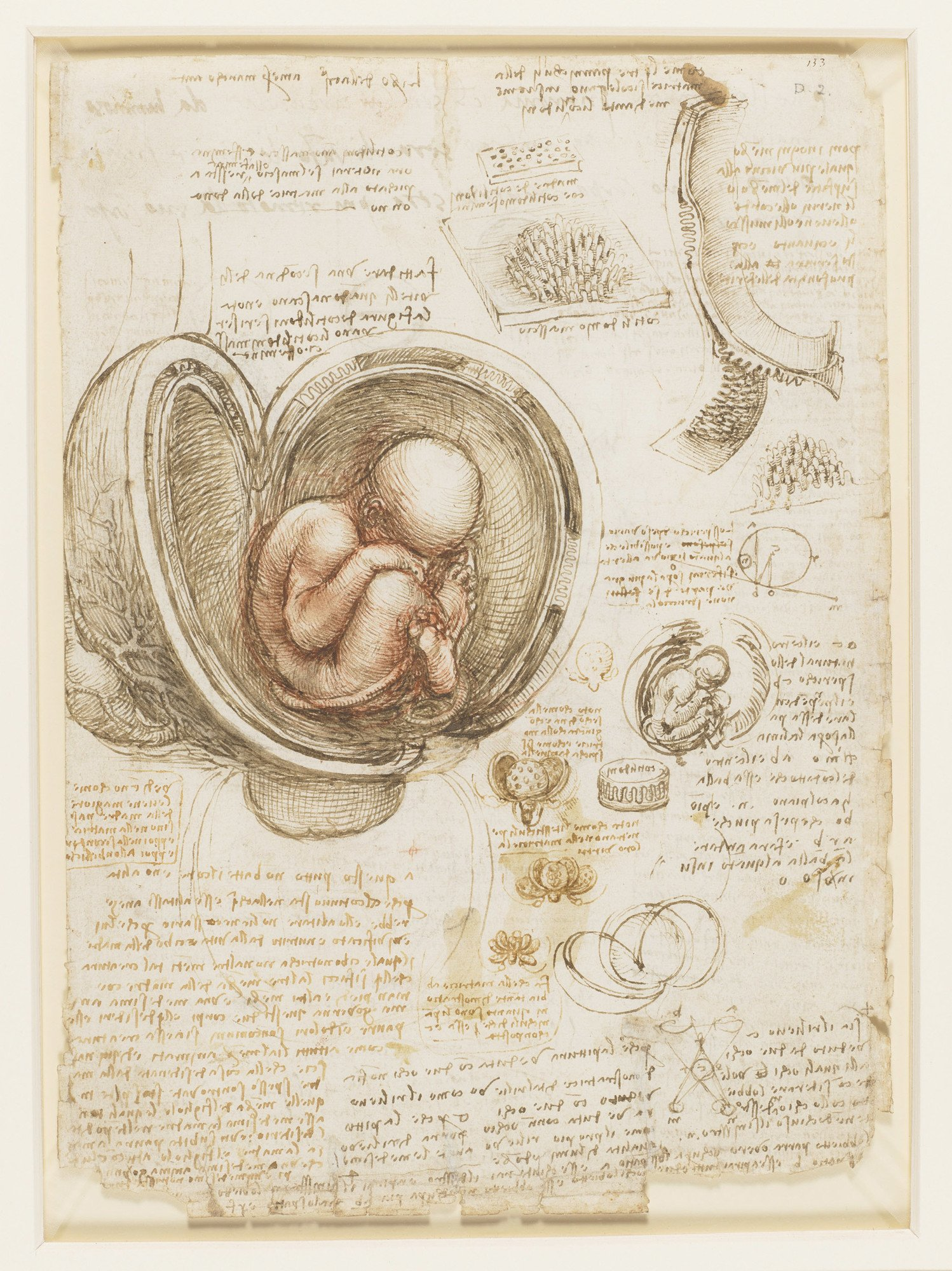
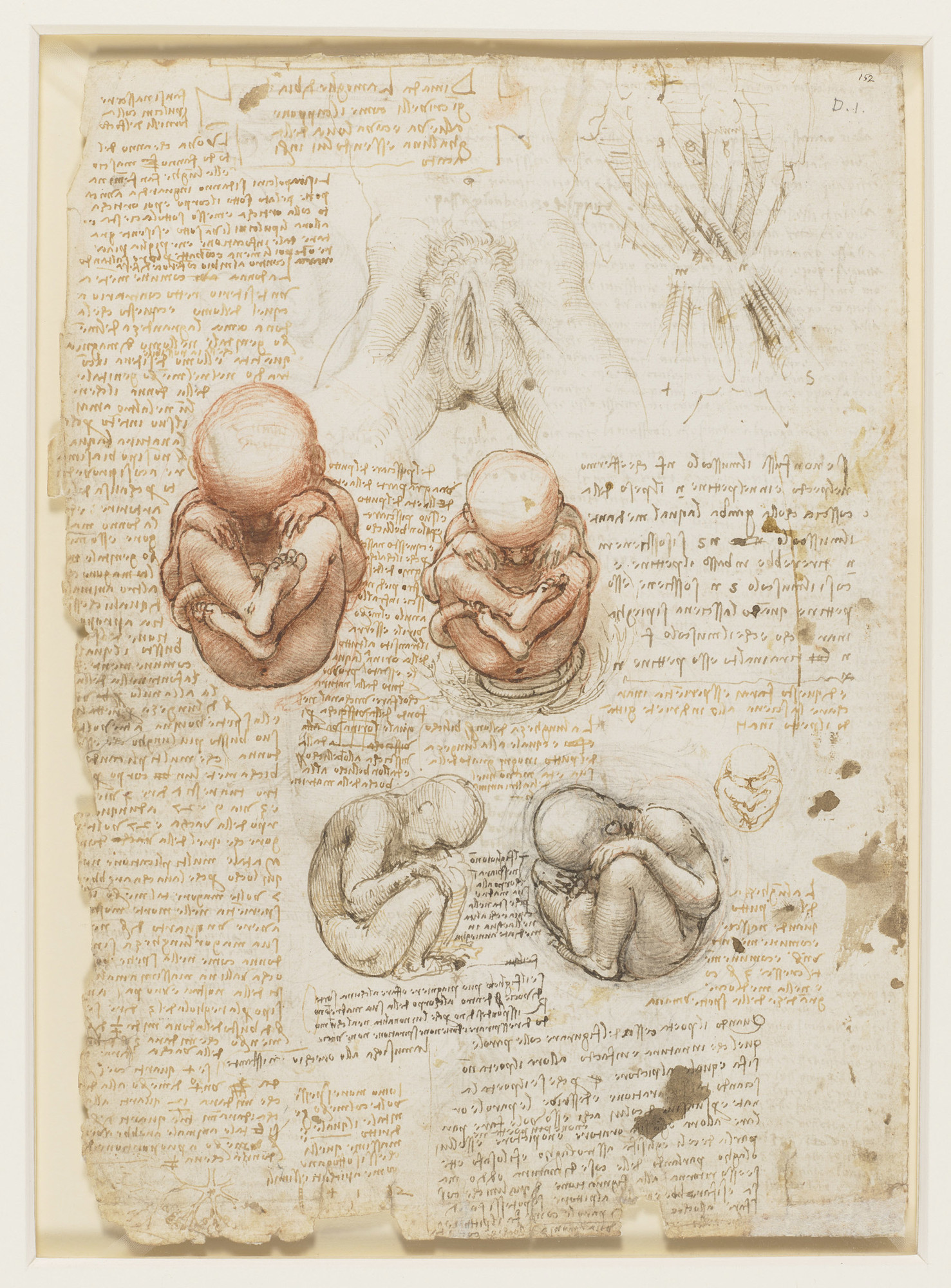
- The fetus in the womb The female external genitalia and five views of the fetus in the womb
- Artist: Leonardo da Vinci
- Year: c. 1511
- Type: Black chalk, sanguine, pen, ink wash on paper
- Location: Royal Collection, United Kingdom

Studies of the Fetus in the Womb are two coloured annotated sketches by Leonardo da Vinci made in around 1511. The studies correctly depict the human fetus in its proper position inside a dissected uterus. Leonardo depicted the uterus with one chamber, in contrast to theories that the uterus had multiple chambers which many believed divided fetuses into separate compartments in the case of twins. Leonardo also correctly drew the uterine artery and the vascular system of the cervix and vagina.

== Preparation and the studies ==
Leonardo studied human embryology with the help of anatomist Marcantonio della Torre and saw the fetus within a cadaver. The first study, measuring 30.5×22 cm, shows the fetus in a breech position inside a dissected uterus. Leonardo mistakenly depicted the cotyledons in the vascular walls of the human uterus that he had previously found in a cow uterus. The other study, measuring 30.3×22 cm, shows female external genitalia, the supposed arrangement of abdominal muscles on the top right and fetus from different angles. The tablet at the top contains an Italian inscription: "Dimanda la moglie di Biagin Crivelli come il cappone alleva le oua della ghallina essendo lui imbricato" ("Ask Biagino Crivelli's wife how the capon rears and hatches the eggs of hens when he is unplucked"). Leonardo theorised that the umbilical cord was responsible for taking the fetus's urine outside of the uterus.

== Provenance ==
The studies were initially bequeathed to Francesco Melzi. In c. 1582–90 they were bought from his heirs by Pompeo Leoni and by 1630 they belonged to Thomas Howard, 2nd Earl of Arundel. Since 1690 the studies have been housed in the Royal Collection, United Kingdom.

== See also ==
- List of works by Leonardo da Vinci
