= International Image Interoperability Framework =

Standardised method of describing and delivering images over the web

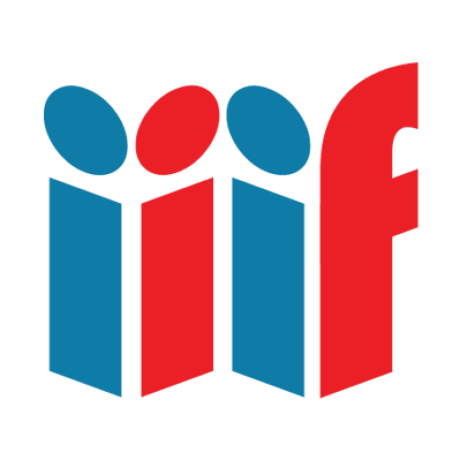
IIIF logo

The International Image Interoperability Framework (IIIF, spoken as 'triple-I-eff') defines several application programming interfaces that provide a standardised method of describing and delivering images over the web, as well as "presentation based metadata" (that is, structural metadata) about structured sequences of images. If institutions holding artworks, books, newspapers, manuscripts, maps, scrolls, single sheet collections, and archival materials provide IIIF endpoints for their content, any IIIF-compliant viewer or application can consume and display both the images and their structural and presentation metadata.

There are many digitisation programmes that have resulted in a particular collection's content exposed on the web in a particular viewer application, but these various collections have not typically been interoperable with one another, and end users or institutions cannot substitute a viewer of their choice to consume the digitised material. The IIIF aims to cultivate shared technologies for both client and server to enable interoperability across repositories, and to foster a market in compatible servers and viewing applications.

== Image API ==
The IIIF Image API specifies a web service that returns an image in response to a standard HTTP or HTTPS request. The URI can specify the region, size, rotation, quality characteristics and format of the requested image. A URI can also be constructed to request basic technical information about the image to support client applications.

One major use of an Image API endpoint for a given high resolution source image is to allow clients to request low resolution tiles for use in a Deep Zoom style viewing tool such as OpenSeadragon.

== Presentation API ==
The IIIF Presentation API specifies a web service that returns JSON-LD structured documents that together describe the structure and layout of a digitized object or other collection of images and related content.

An institution would publish a Manifest (a JSON-LD document) that describes the structure of each book, artwork, manuscript or other artefact. The manifest contains references to Image API endpoints. A viewer application consuming the manifest can produce a coherent user experience for the artefact by implementing features such as page by page navigation, deep zooming into images and annotations on images.

== Search API ==
The IIIF Search API allows for "searching annotation content within a single IIIF resource, such as a Manifest, Range or Collection."

== Example use case ==
A use case for IIIF would be to allow a user to view a manuscript that has been dismembered in the past, with its leaves now scattered across various collections. If each collection exposes its digitized images via the Image API, then a scholar can construct and publish a manifest that digitally recombines the leaves to present a single coherent user experience for the manuscript in any compatible viewer.

== History ==
The Image API was proposed in late 2011 as a collaboration between The British Library, Stanford University, the Bodleian Libraries (Oxford University), the Bibliothèque nationale de France, Nasjonalbiblioteket (National Library of Norway), Los Alamos National Laboratory Research Library, and Cornell University. Version 1.0 was published in 2012.

Version 1.0 of the Presentation API was published in 2013 and of the Search API in 2016.

== Partial list of software that supports IIIF APIs ==
=== Image Servers ===
- Cantaloupe
- Hymir IIIF Server
- Loris IIIF Image Server
- IIPImage
- digilib
- Djatoka (with helper)

=== Viewers / client libraries ===
- OpenSeadragon
- Mirador
- Clover IIIF
- Canopy IIIF
- Wellcome Player / British Library Universal Viewer
- IIIFViewer
- Leaflet-IIIF
- IIPMooViewer
- iNQUIRE
- CONTENTdm
- Turning the Pages (TTP)
- Prismia ViSiON

== See also ==
- DjVu
