= Turning the Pages =

Turning the Pages is software technology for viewing scanned books on-line in a realistic and detailed manner. It was developed by the British Library in partnership with Armadillo Systems.

The original version, first released in 1997, used Adobe Shockwave.

In January 2007 version 2.0 version was developed for Microsoft Vista using a browser-based Windows Presentation Foundation format. Features include page turns that are modelled on the actually deformation of different types of material (for example in a book with vellum pages, which is heavier than printed on paper, will appear to collapse under its own weight as it is turned). For certain books, such as the Sherborne Missal, the gold leaf catches the light as the book moves around.

The British Library initially released a "Turning the Pages Toolkit" for libraries around the world to put their collections online, this was further developed into a full content management system by Armadillo Systems to allow libraries to generate their own Turning the Pages kiosks, and publish online versions which utilised HTML5.

The Codex Leicester, along with Codex Arundel, were two of the first books to be made available in the 2.0 format, with Bill Gates saying "This is an innovative way to bring treasures - including mine - to a new audience."

Turning the Pages is compatible with the International Image Interoperability Framework (IIIF) and can open IIIF manifests.

Turning the Pages and the content management system (TTP CMS) are still actively maintained by Armadillo Systems.
