= Leone Leoni =

Italian sculptor (c. 1509 – 1590)

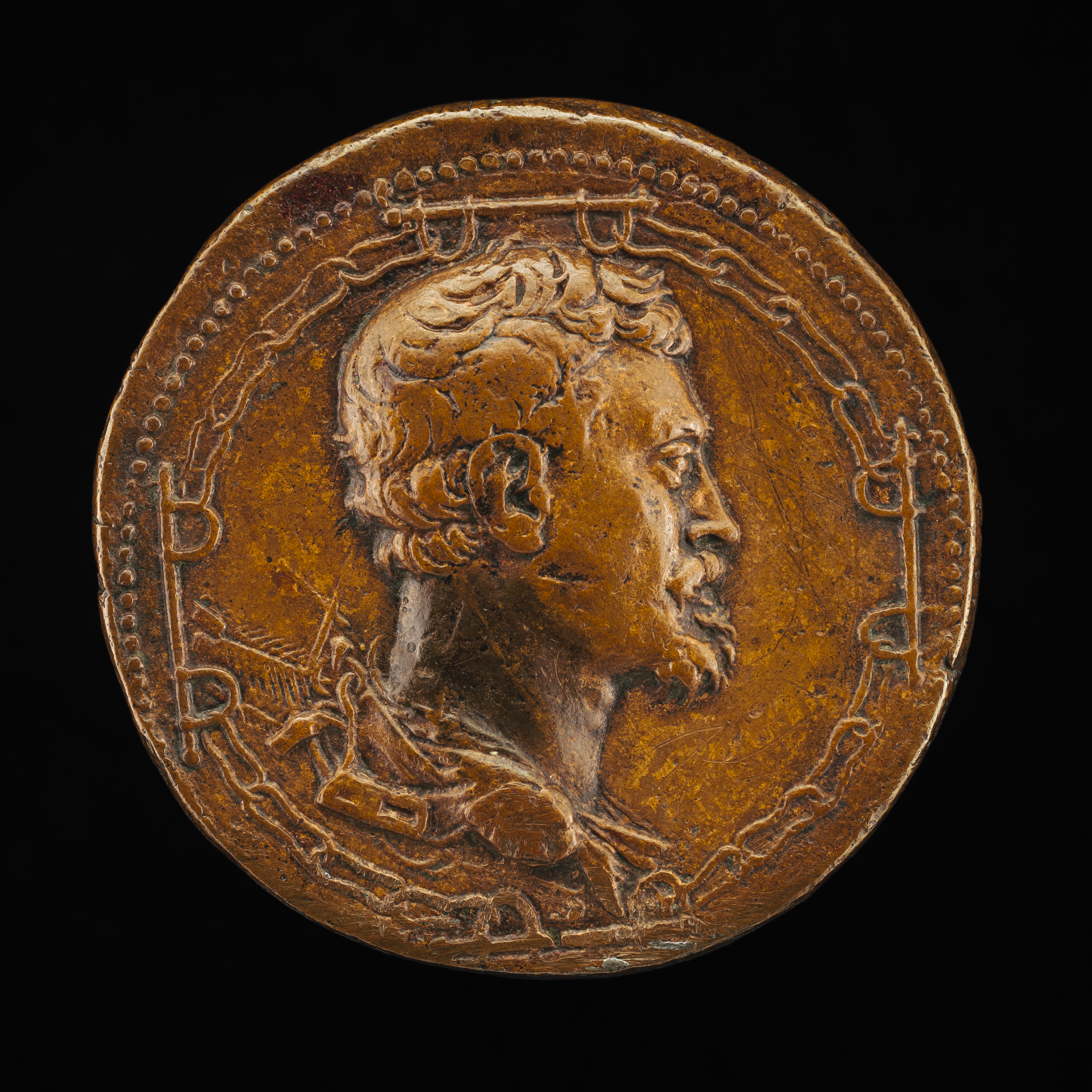
- Born: 1509; Menaggio, Arezzo
- Died: 22 July 1590 (aged 80–81); Milan
- Occupations: Sculptor, medalist, goldsmith

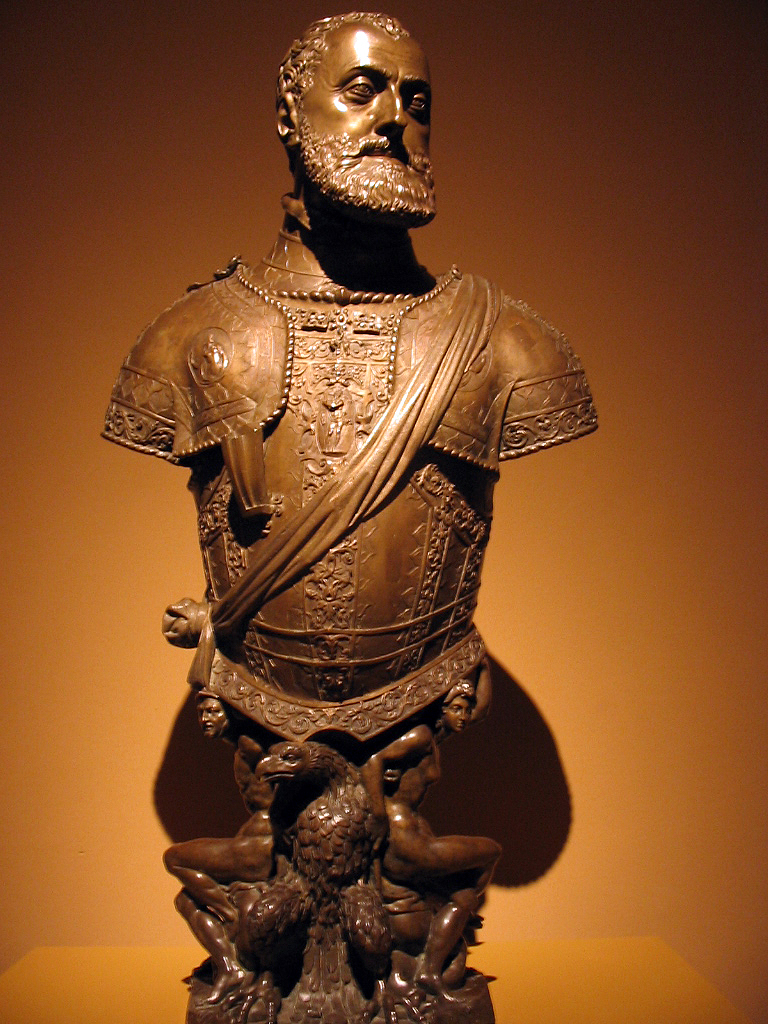
Charles V, Holy Roman Emperor, Museo del Prado

Leone Leoni (c. 1509 – 22 July 1590) was an Italian sculptor of international outlook who travelled in Italy, Germany, Austria, France, Spain and the Netherlands. Leoni is regarded as the finest of the Cinquecento medallists. He made his reputation in commissions he received from the Habsburg monarchs Charles V, Holy Roman Emperor and Philip II of Spain. His usual medium was bronze, although he also worked in marble and alabaster, carved gemstones and probably left some finished work in wax (in which many of his sculptures were modelled), as well as designing coins. He mainly produced portraits, and was repeatedly used by the Spanish, and also the Austrian, Habsburgs.

== Biography ==
His family origins were at Arezzo, though he was probably born at Menaggio near Lake Como, and his early training, to judge from the finish of his medals, was with a medallist or goldsmith, as Vasari says. His earliest documentation finds him at Venice after 1533, with his wife and infant son, living under the protection of his Aretine compatriot (and possible kinsman), Pietro Aretino, who introduced him to the circle of Titian. Taking advantage of his rival Benvenuto Cellini's being in prison at the time, he secured the role of designer for the Papal mint in Ferrara (1538–40) but was forced to withdraw under accusations of counterfeiting levelled by Pellegrino di Leuti, the jeweller of the Farnese Pope Paul III. Leoni then attacked Pellegrino and was condemned to lose his right hand, a sentence commuted after the intercession of powerful friends to slavery in the galleys, from which the entreaties of Andrea Doria released him after a year: Leoni produced three plaquettes and five medals of Andrea Doria as tokens of his gratitude.

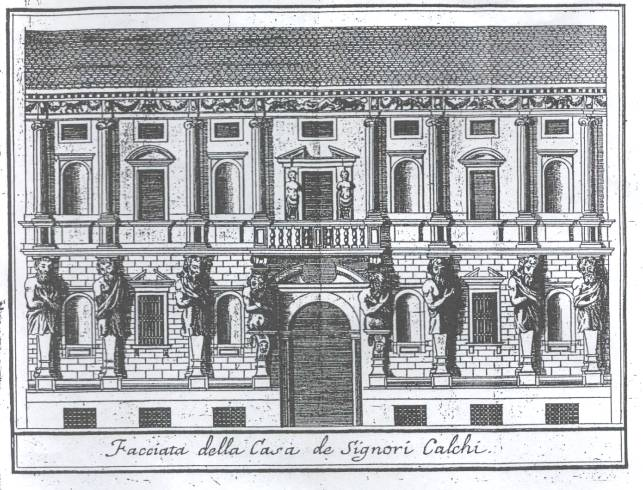
The Casa degli Omenoni that Leoni designed for himself, engraving from Serviliano's Descrizione di Milano, 1738

Once freed from the galleys, he "continued his alternation of criminal violence and exquisite workmanship" moving to Milan to take up an Imperial appointment as master of the mint there, from 20 February 1542, at 150 ducats a year and the gift of a house in the Moroni district of Milan. Leoni's house in Milan, rebuilt 1565–67, was immediately called the Casa degli Omenoni for its heroically-scaled herm figures and bearded atlantes, a rarity in Milan at the time; it is indicative of his social success. The figures were carved by Antonio Abondio, doubtless following Leoni's models. Here he entertained Giorgio Vasari, who noted Leoni's large collection of plaster casts after the Antique, dominated by a stucco of the equestrian Marcus Aurelius from the Campidoglio in his courtyard. His early protector in Milan, with whom he was on familiar terms, was the Imperial Governor, Ferrante Gonzaga. He lived in Milan thereafter, despite calls from his patrons to base himself, or at least present himself, at court, claiming that only there could he obtain the proper materials for his work – a notable contrast with Giambologna who was never allowed to leave Florence by his Grand Duke, as he bitterly complained, for fear the Habsburgs would ensnare him. Among other later violent incidents, he was supposed to have attempted to murder Titian's son, who was staying with him in Milan.

He had made an early reputation for portrait medallions, before his major commissions from Charles V, whose image for posterity lies in his portraits by Titian and Leoni. Leoni was the guest of Charles in Brussels in 1549, and the first of the portraits from life dates from this time; however, Leoni had made a portrait medallion of Charles in 1536. In Brussels the Emperor installed Leoni in an apartment below his own and delighted in his company, spending hours watching him at work, Vasari recalled. He knighted Leoni on 2 November 1549.

For the cathedral of Milan, Leone executed the five bronze figures for the monument of the condottiero Gian Giacomo Medici, brother of Pope Pius IV, in a marble architectural setting that Vasari attributed to a drawing by Michelangelo.

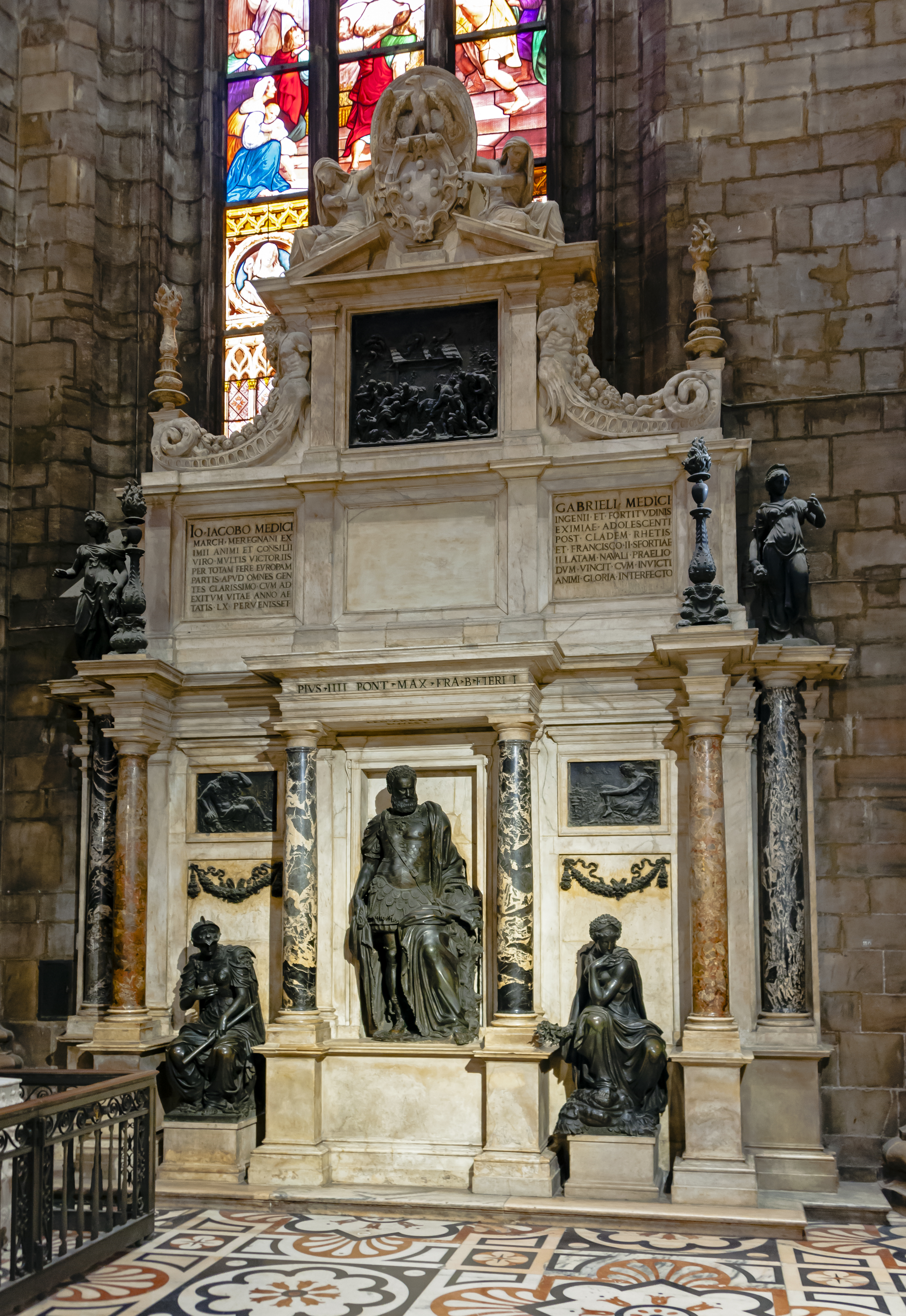
Leoni's memorial in Milan Cathedral for Gian Giacomo Medici (died in 1555)

On a commission from Cardinal Granvelle (1516–86), Bishop of Arras, Archbishop of Mechelen, Viceroy of Naples, and the leading Habsburg minister, Leone cast life-sized half-figures in richly framed ovals, of Charles, Philip and the Cardinal, described by Vasari. Granvelle would often correspond with Leoni, whom he may have known from his youth as a student in Padua, about Habsburg commissions (which usually overran their promised delivery dates).

A marble portrait of Giovan Battista Castaldo, at the Church of San Bartolomeo, Nocera Inferiore — a commission mentioned by Vasari who thought it was bronze and did not know to which monastery it had been sent — was included in the exhibition Tiziano e il ritratto di corte, Museo di Capodimonte, Naples, 2006.

Leoni's commissions for royal portraiture in Spain were an extension of his Habsburg patronage. On his return from Spain, where he executed the series of royal portraits, he brought a purse of 2000 scudi, according to Vasari. He pioneered what became a common Baroque format for a portrait bust; mounted on a pedestal, and truncated at mid-chest, or the bottom of the stomach (often defined by an armoured breast-plate), sweeping up at the sides to just below the shoulders. He also made life-size full-length portrait bronzes, like that of Charles V, which were not intended as funerary effigies, as nearly all previous examples had been.

Leoni was assisted in the monumental bronzes destined for the Escorial by his son Pompeo Leoni (c.1533–1608), who continued the large bronze-casting foundry after his father's death, in a style that is not securely separated from that of his father. Among the assistants to Pompeo was Adriaen de Vries. Pompeo assembled the drawings and notes of Leonardo da Vinci that constitute the Codex Atlanticus in Milan.

Leoni's name remained among the few recognizable landmarks in 16th century sculpture and consequently attracted many attributions during the nineteenth century.

George Sand's Leone Leoni is not based on the sculptor's career.

== Selected attributed works ==
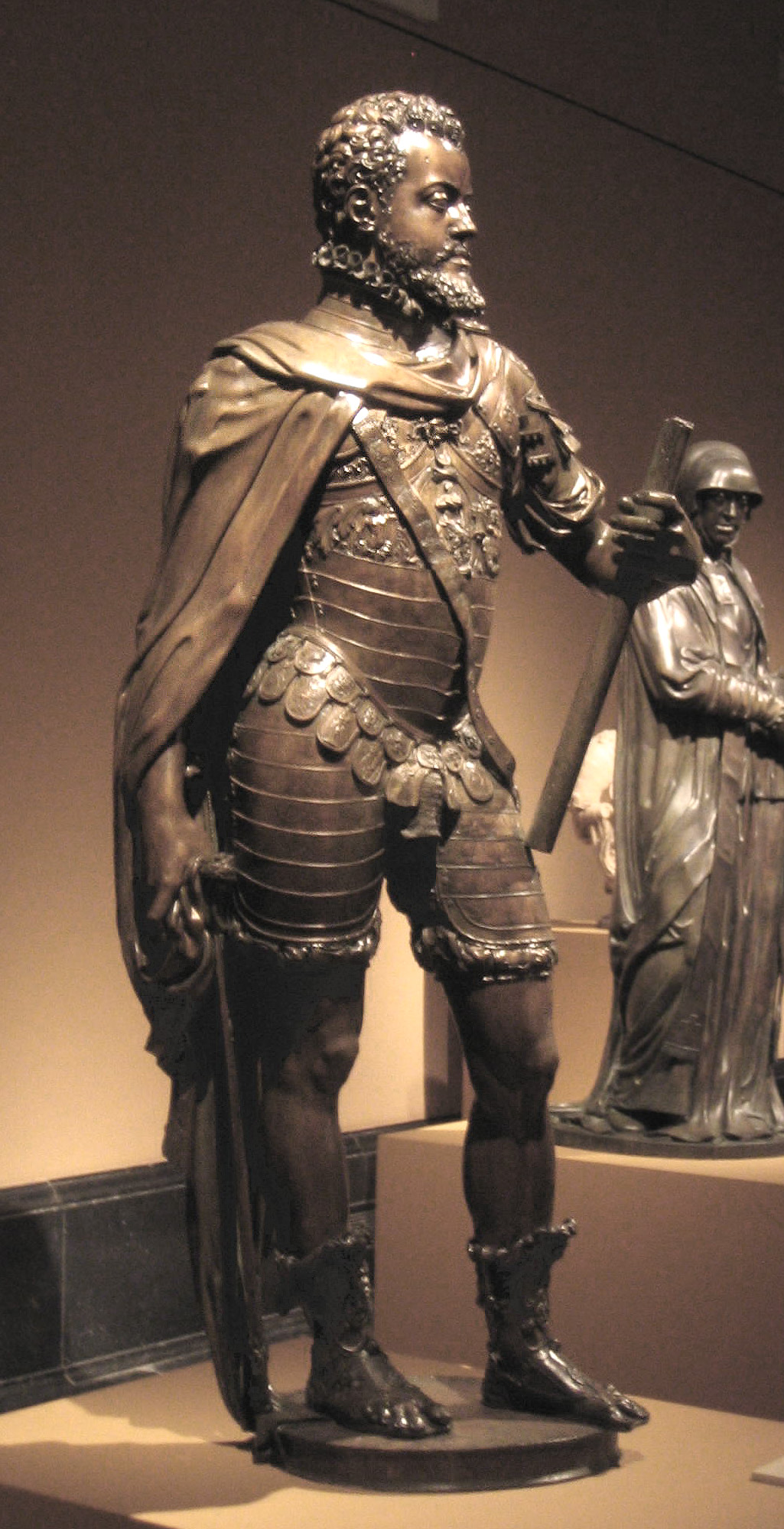
Bronze statue of Philip II of Spain (1551–53, Museo del Prado, Madrid)

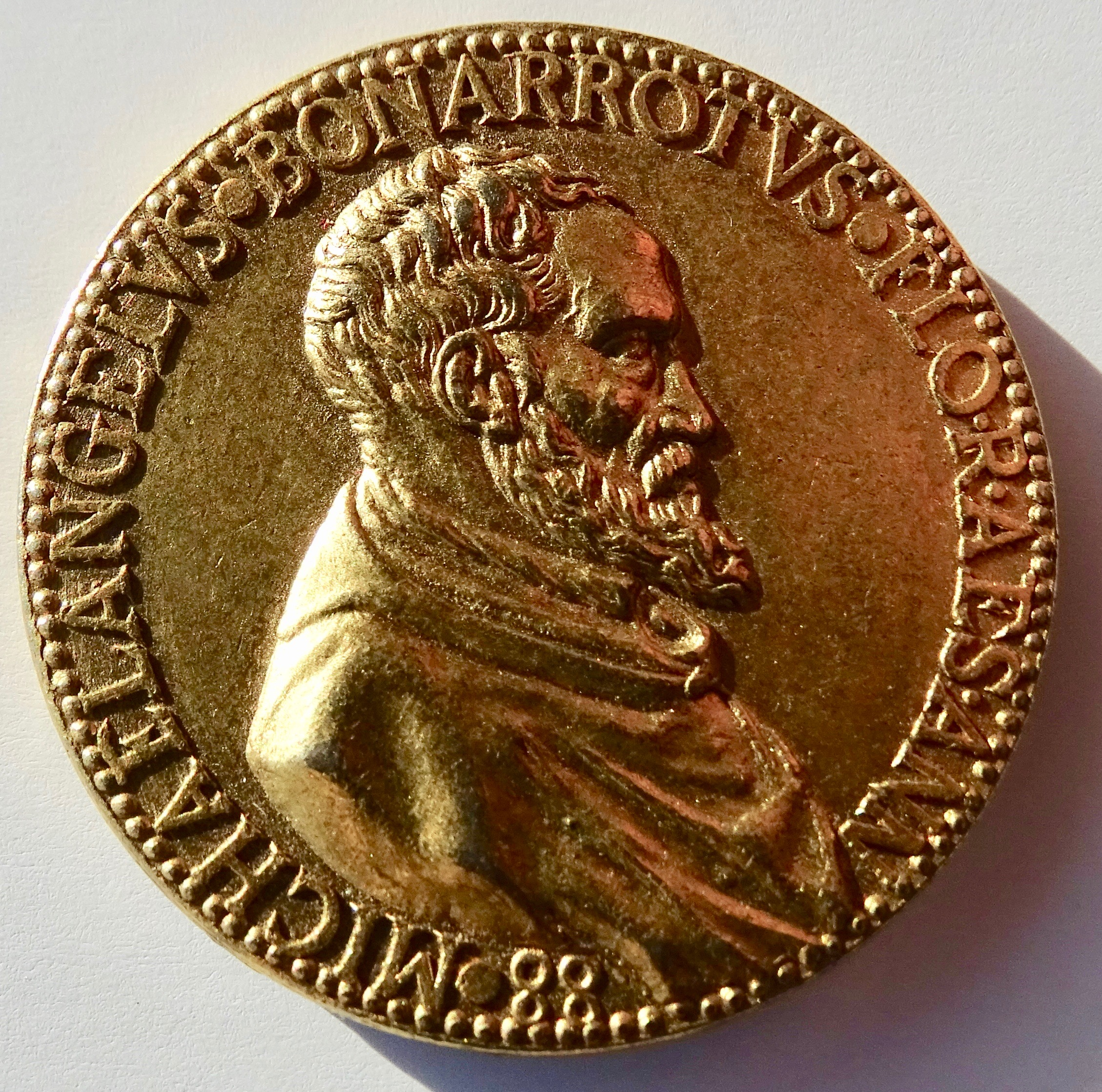
Portrait of Michelangelo on a medal for his 88th birthday

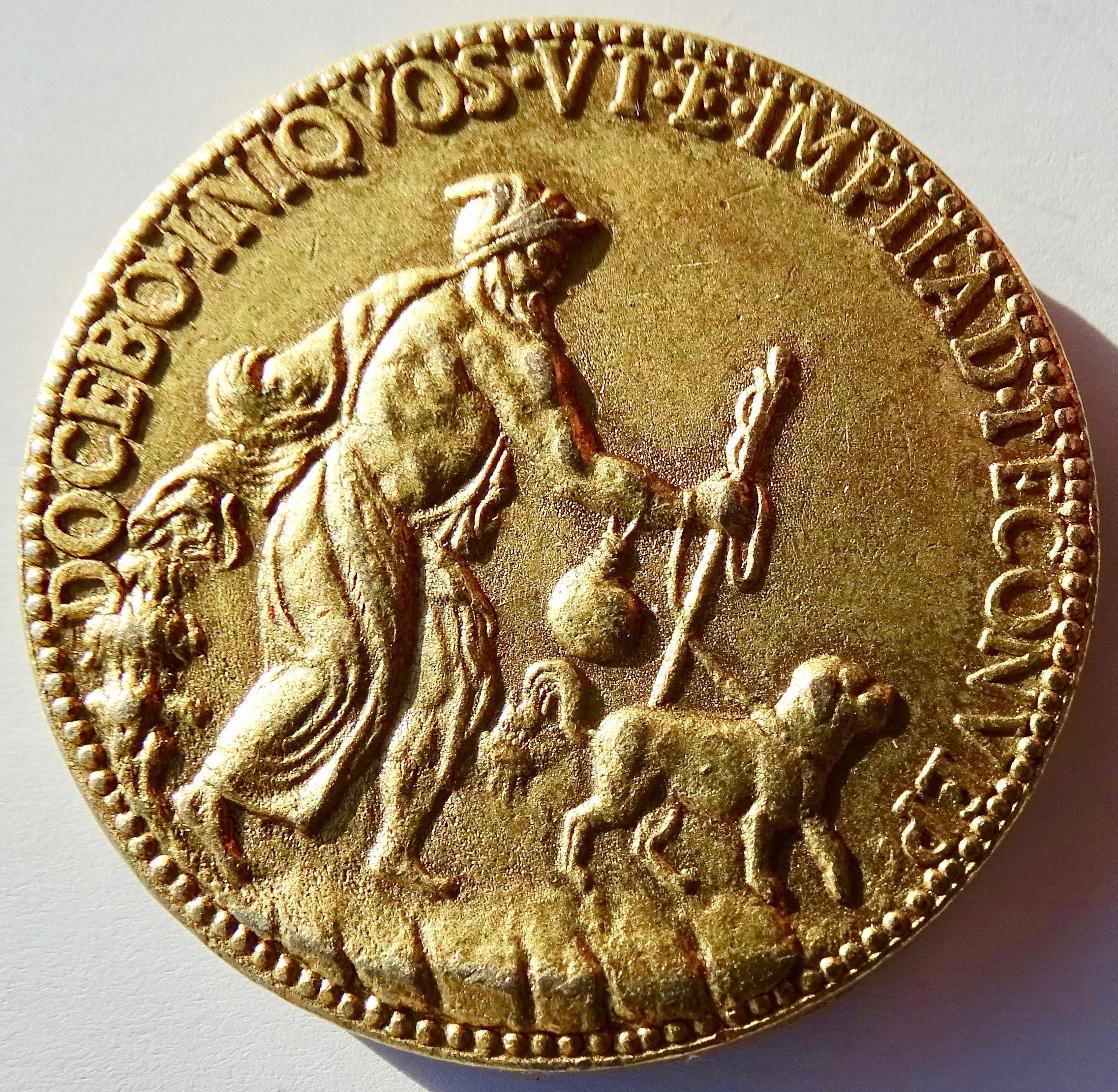
The reverse of Michelangelo's 88th birthday medal

- Medals including Charles V, Ferdinand I, Philip II, Giorgio Vasari, Michelangelo Buonarroti, Andrea Doria, and Ippolita Gonzaga;
- Charles V Dominating Fury, 1550–53 (Museo del Prado);
- Standing portrait of Isabella of Portugal (Museo del Prado);
- Bust of Giacomo Maria Stampa, 1553 (Walters Art Museum);
- Portrait of Philip II (1554), exhibited in Milan for several months (Philip was Duke of Milan), before being sent to Spain;
- Bust of Alfonso d'Avalos, marchese del Vasto, bronze (Morgan Library, New York);
- Five bronze figures in the monument to Gian Giacomo Medici di Marignano, 1560–63 (Milan Cathedral), portrait of Gian Giacomo with Peace and Martial Virtue; above are Providence and Fame; this was Leoni's first venture at an architectural setting, with a design that Vasari said had been provided by Michelangelo;
- Triumph of Ferrante Gonzaga over Envy, 1564, commissioned by his son Cesare Gonzaga to commemorate Ferrante's governorship of Milan and noted by Vasari (Piazza Mazzini, Guastalla);
- Kneeling figures of Charles V, Philip II and their families, for the church at the Escorial;
- Bust of Charles V (Museo del Prado);
- Bust of Philip II, alabaster (Museo del Prado); another in marble in the Metropolitan;
- Bust of Charles Emmanuel I, Duke of Savoy as a boy, bronze, 1572 (Philadelphia Museum of Art);
- Busts of Charles V, Philip II and the Duke of Alva, noted by Vasari, the first two usually Windsor Castle;
- Half-figures in ovals of Charles V, Philip II and Cardinal Granvelle, noted by Vasari;
- Carved gemstone miniatures of Charles V and Philip II (double portrait), Isabella of Portugal, Charles' empress, in the Metropolitan, where there is also an enamelled and jewelled gold pendant medallion of Charles V;
- Undated medal (1563) for Michelangelo's 88th birthday.
