= Da Vinci's self supporting bridge =

Bridge design

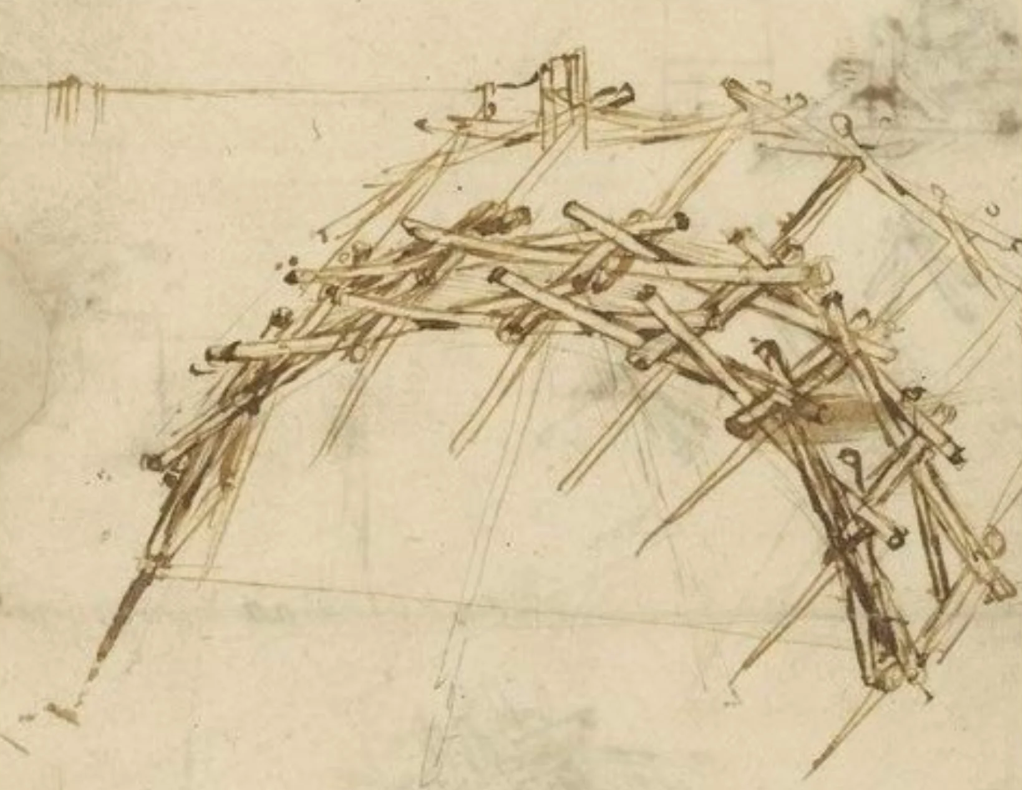
Drawing of the bridge concept by da Vinci within the Codex Atlanticus.

Leonardo da Vinci's self-supporting bridge is a bridge design from the Codex Atlanticus (written between 1478 and 1518) with the unique feature of requiring no nails, dowels, or ropes in its construction. The structure (only theorized by da Vinci) is held together solely by the compressive forces from its own weight and the friction between its wooden components.

== Description ==
The bridge is designed to be assembled and disassembled very quickly. Its main structure consists only of wooden beams of similar dimensions, and no tools are needed for assembly.

The bridge was conceived while Leonardo da Vinci was under the patronage of Cesare Borgia, and its plans are found in the Codex Atlanticus (folios 69 AR and 71 V). The sketch of the bridge depicts a self-supporting structure requiring neither nails nor ropes for assembly. Cesare Borgia employed da Vinci as a military engineer and architect, and this type of bridge was likely designed to enable troops to cross rivers quickly with a structure that could be set up in minutes and collapsed by removing any single piece.

== Study of the concept ==
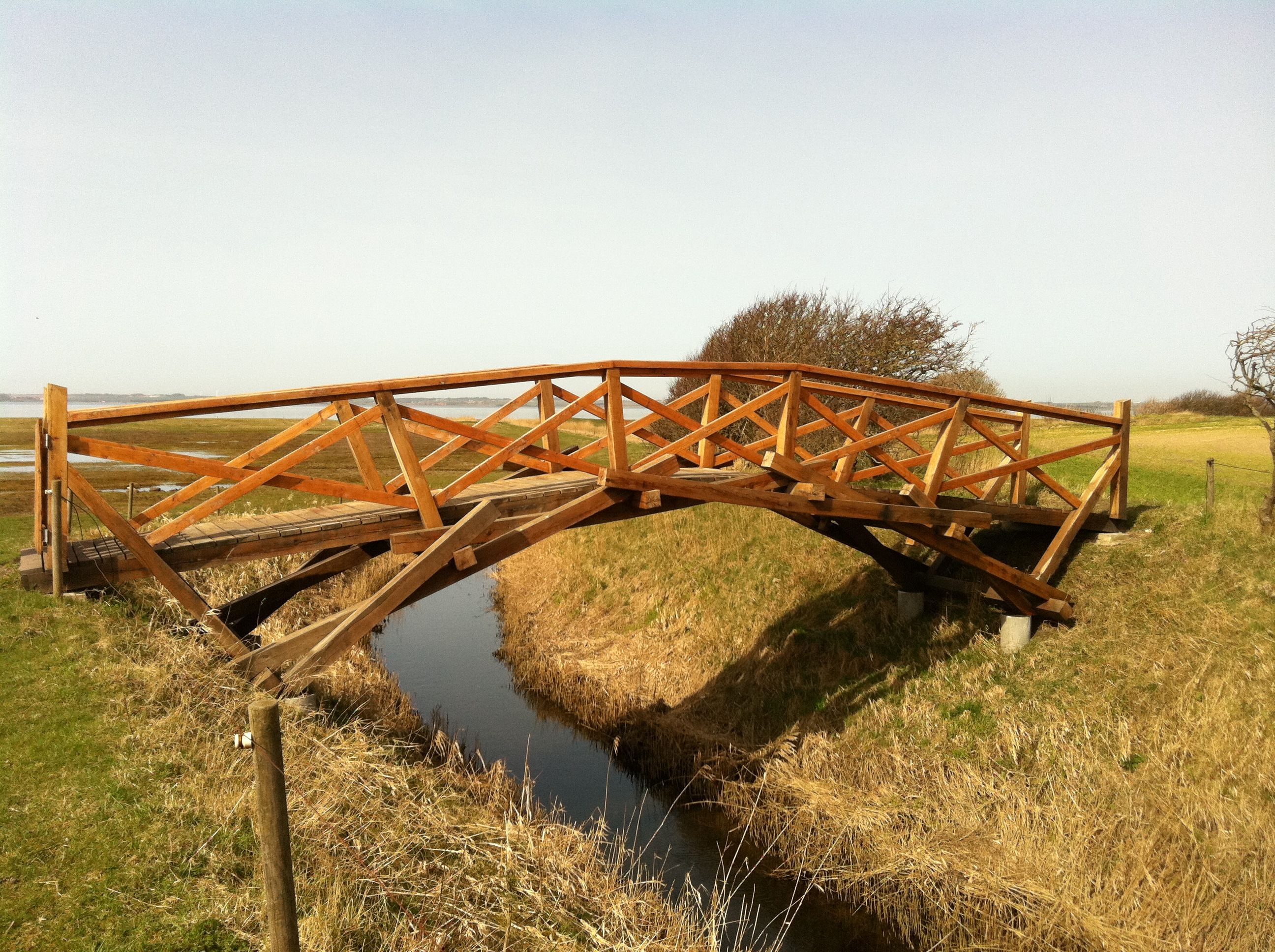
Self supporting bridge made after da Vinci's concept in Denmark.

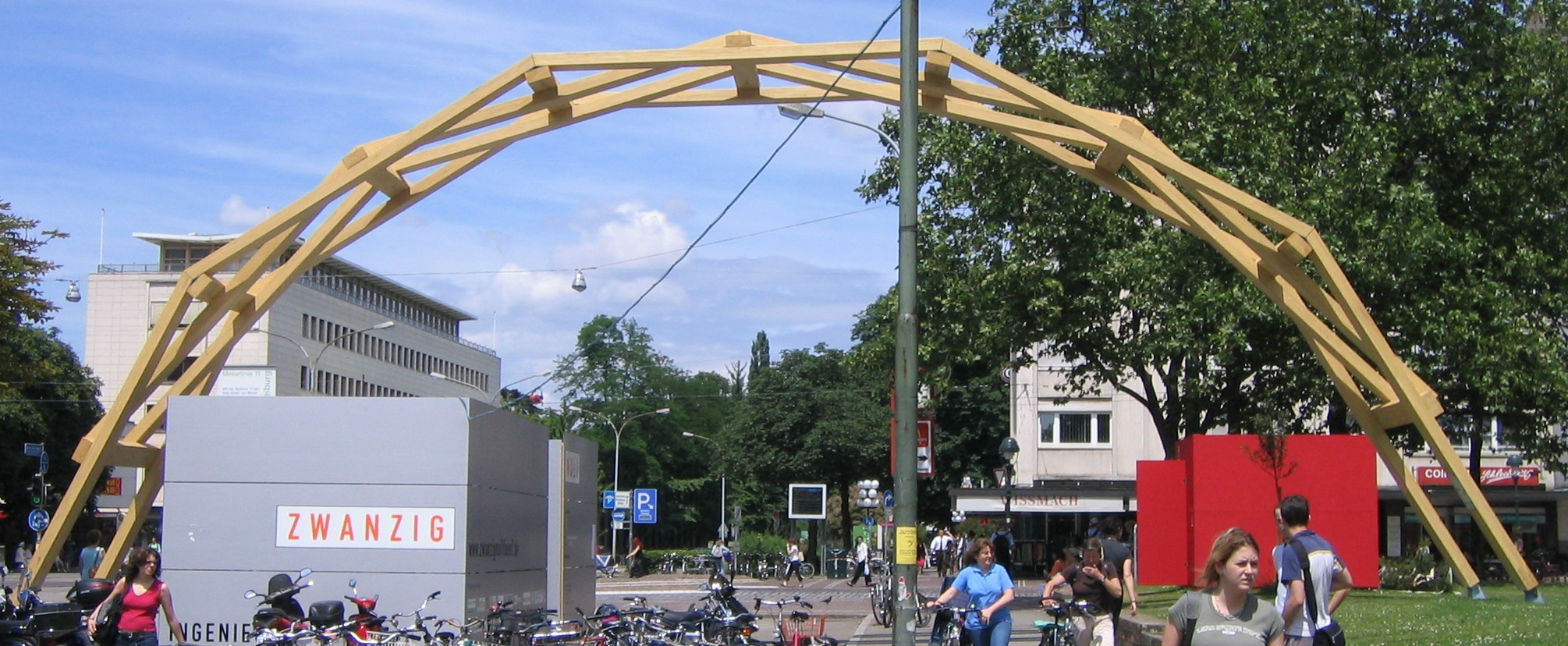
The bridge concept made as an art piece in Freiburg im Breisgau(Germany).

In a technical analysis of the self-supporting bridge design, critical dimensions (length, height, angles) and support reactions for each beam (considering wood as the material) were modeled. Simulations were then conducted for bridge lengths ranging from 4 to 7 meters, revealing that structural efficiency increases with height, but at the expense of practicality for crossing. An optimal compromise was found for a height-to-length ratio of 0.30.

The self-supporting bridge has been proposed as an experimental platform for dynamic vibration studies and has proven to be very robust across a wide range of low and high frequencies. However, it tends to disassemble when subjected to frequencies close to its resonant frequency.
