= Codex Windsor =

Set of drawings and writings by Leonardo da Vinci

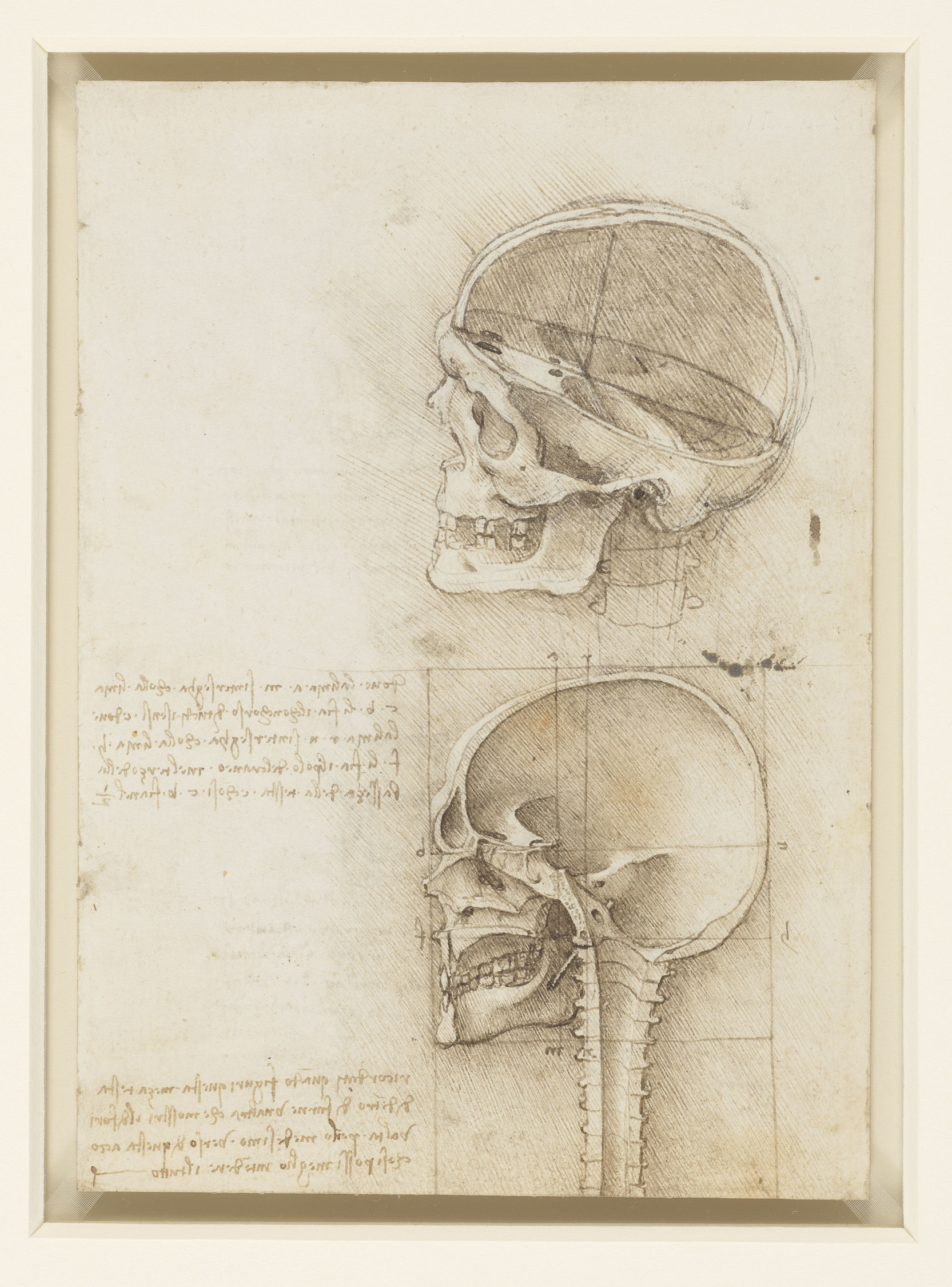
Sagittal sections of the human skull

The Codex Windsor is a collection of manuscript sheets with artistic drawings and anatomical studies by the Italian Renaissance artist Leonardo da Vinci.

== Name ==
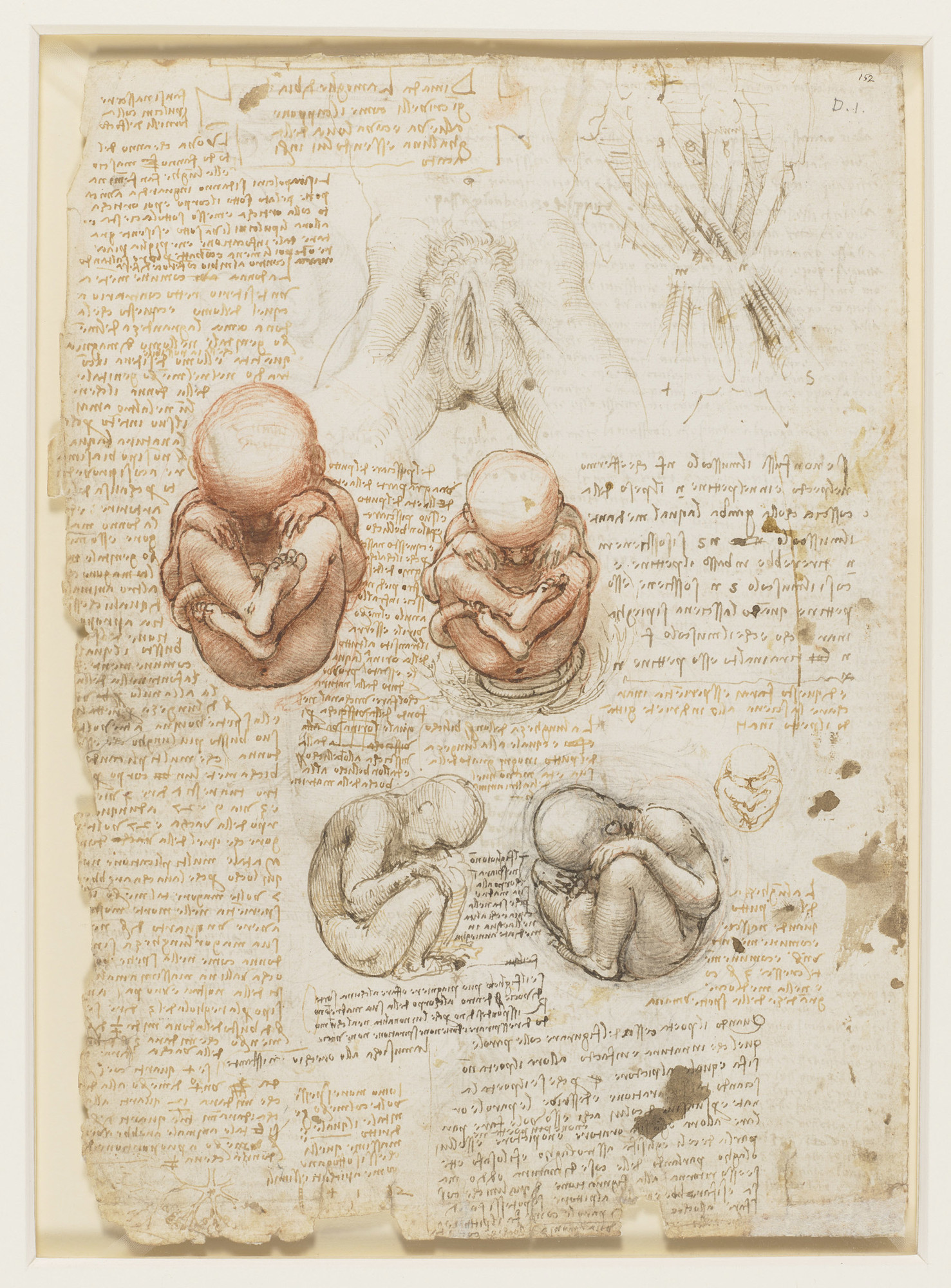
Position of the fetus in the womb

The Codex Windsor owes its name to its preservation in the Royal Collection at Windsor Castle, where it has been since the 17th century.

== Content ==
The collection now comprises 606 individually catalogued sheets in various formats. The sheets of the codex are dated to the period between 1478 and 1518. The texts and commentaries were written by Leonardo in mirror script. The sheets contain contributions to art and painting, studies of people, animals, plants, and landscapes, as well as mechanics, weaponry, and anatomy.

The 153 sheets of anatomical drawings were previously grouped into three volumes: Anatomical Manuscript A (18 sheets), B (42 sheets), and C (93 sheets). Anatomical manuscript C was in turn divided into six anatomical quires, the Quaderni di anatomia I–VI.

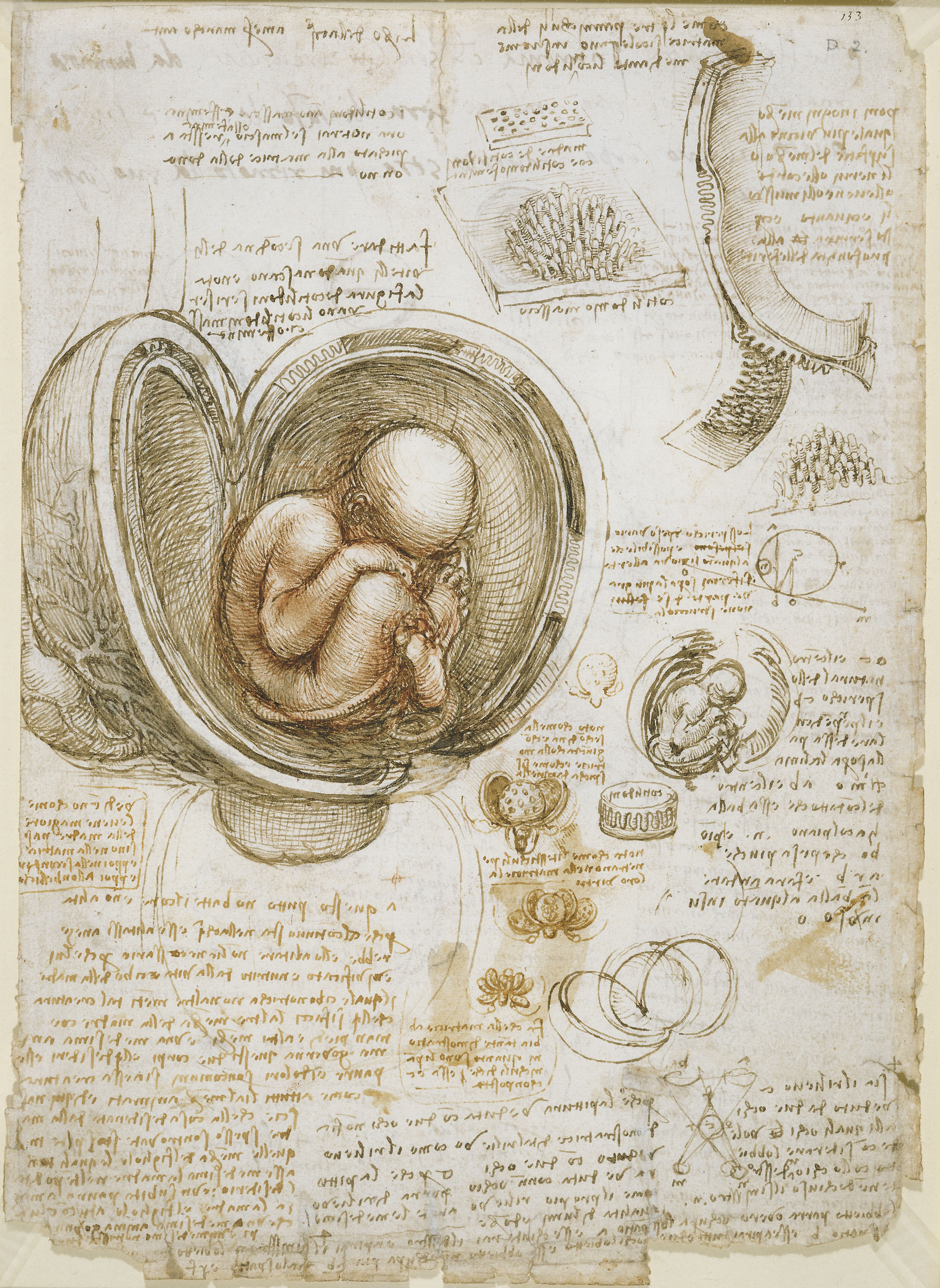
Studies of a fetus in the womb, from Codex Windsor (W.19102 recto), black chalk, sanguine, pen, ink wash on paper

One image shows a fetus in the right position within an excised uterus. Leonardo also accurately drew uterine arteries and the vascular system of the cervix and vagina. To prepare for these drawings, Leonardo studied human embryology with the help of anatomist Marcantonio della Torre and saw a fetus in a dissected corpse.

=== History ===
Leonardo da Vinci began studying the anatomy of the human body in the late 1470s and may have participated in the first dissections at the University of Padua. His records indicate that he began performing autopsies himself around 1505. By the year 1518, he reported that he had performed a total of thirty autopsies during his lifetime. He seems to have been particularly interested in the movement and function of internal organs.

Leonardo's drawings show representations of the entire human body in various stages of dissection, as well as individual limbs and organs. He drew body parts through multiple incisions and is therefore often considered the historical founder of tomographic imaging in medicine. It is mentioned that the Codex Windsor also deals with Leonardo's incessant study of horses, their movements, their postures, etc.

After Leonardo's death most of his manuscripts and drawings were kept at his villa near Vaprio d'Adda, Lombardy, by his student and heir Francesco Melzi. His son, Orazio Melzi, inherited the documents in 1570. Around 1590, Orazio Melzi sold over 2,500 individual sheets to the sculptor and art collector Pompeo Leoni.

Leoni attempted to organize the manuscripts thematically, separating Leonardo's artistic ideas from his technical and scientific drawings. He cut out sheets and glued together others that were not originally part of the whole. In this way, he grouped Leonardo's anatomical drawings with other manuscripts on different subjects into several volumes.

The manuscripts were acquired by Charles I in 1630. Now known as the Codex Windsor, they have since remained in the royal collection.
