= Besana (surname) =

Besana is an Italian surname. Notable people with the surname include:

- Fred Besana (born 1954), American football player
- Fred Besana (baseball) (1931–2015), American baseball player

== See also ==
- Besana (disambiguation)
