= Leonardo da Vinci (video game) =

1997 video game

- Release: 1997
- Genre: Interactive CD-ROM

Leonardo da Vinci is a 1997 interactive CD-ROM game by Corbis, consisting of a "computerized viewing tool which permits the user to examine English translations of the Codex [Leicester] superimposed onto facsimiles of its pages". The tool, known as Codescope, is licensed by Corbis.

== Development ==
In 1994, Bill Gates acquired the Codex Leicester. In 1997, Gates' privately held company Corbis released a CD-Rom version of the manuscript. On October 25, 1996 it was announced the game would be ready for the holiday season (Microsoft Windows in November and Macintosh in December), but this was ultimately postponed. The game was one in a line of educational/entertainment CD-ROMs with subjects including Paul Cézanne, Franklin D. Roosevelt, and the Manhattan Project. The game's promotion was kick-started by being featured in a Da Vinci exhibition at the American Museum of Natural History in New York City.

== Content ==
The title contains the Codex Leicester, as well as a virtual gallery of Leonardo's major paintings, plus his drawings, manuscripts, and lost works. Players can view the Codex in the original mirror-script Italian, a reversed “normal” view, a transcription of the original Italian, and a modern English translation. Leonardo Da Vinci is a coffee-table-book type game.

== Critical reception ==
Lawyer Gary L. Wolfstone deemed the project "impressive" and "interpretive". Computer Shopper praised the title's ease of use and slick production values. The Economist felt the game "exemplif[ies] the strengths and weaknesses of multimedia at its current, immature state of development". ATPM felt the game would hold the interest of both novice and scholar. The New York Times deemed it one of the better art-history CD-ROMs, despite some oversights in features and interface. Wired explained that the experience of playing the game was "as if Leonardo can suddenly speak". De Volkskrant felt that the game supported Gates' thesis that computer technology could be a form of art. The Wall Street Journal wrote that while Da Vinci is a popular subject for video games, this title "beats them all".

Corbis did not earn a profit from the game.
