= Codex Leicester =

Compiled famous scientific writings by Leonardo Da Vinci

Codex Leicester Codex Hammer
- Bill Gates estate (since 11 November 1994)
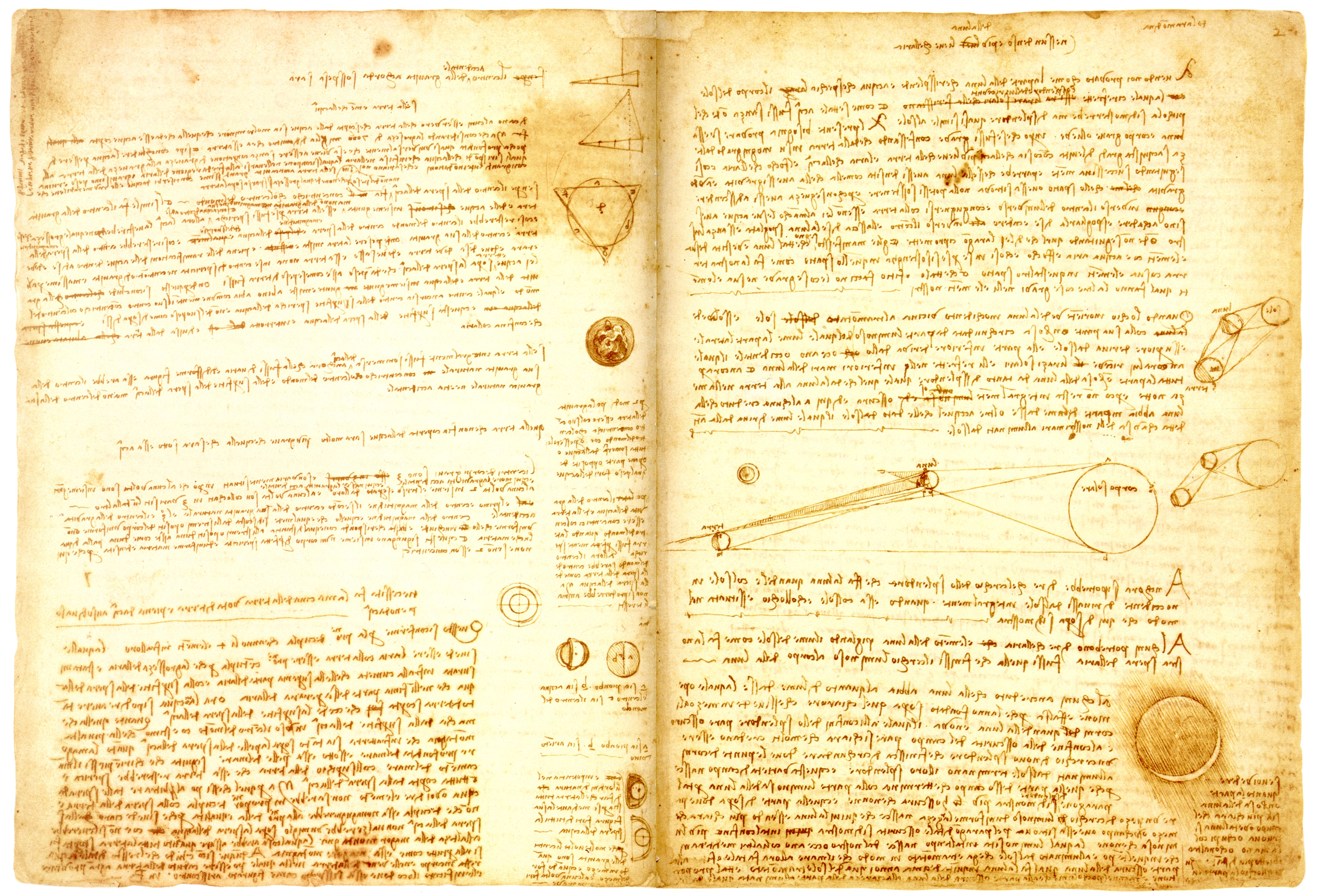
- Type: Codex
- Date: c. 1506 – c. 1508 and c. 1510 – c. 1512
- Place of origin: Florence, Italy
- Language: Italian
- Author: Leonardo da Vinci
- Material: Rag paper
- Size: 18 sheets, 72 folio pages; ~400 mm (16 in) by ~300 mm (12 in)
- Condition: Unbound, separately mounted
- Script: Handwritten mirror script
- Contents: Renaissance science
- Additions: Watermarks —: cardinal hat; eagle; tulip; fleur-de-lis
- Previously kept: Guglielmo della Porta (unknown); Giuseppe Ghezzi (until 1719); Thomas Coke, 1st Earl of Leicester (1719–1759); Leicester estate (1759–1980); Armand Hammer (1980-1994)

The Codex Leicester (also briefly known as the Codex Hammer) is a collection of scientific writings by Leonardo da Vinci. The codex is named after Thomas Coke, Earl of Leicester, who purchased it in 1719. The codex provides an insight into the mind of the Renaissance artist, scientist and thinker, as well as an exceptional illustration of the link between art and science and the creativity of the scientific process.

When the manuscript was last sold to Bill Gates at Christie's auction house on 11 November 1994 in New York for US$30,802,500 (equivalent to $67 million in 2025), it was the most expensive manuscript ever sold.

== Manuscript ==
The leather-bound notebook comprises 36 sheets, 29 × 22 cm. The manuscript is not a single linear script but a mixture of Leonardo's observations and theories on astronomy and the properties of water, rocks, fossils, air, and celestial light. The topics addressed include:

- An explanation of why fossils of sea creatures can be found on mountains. Hundreds of years before plate tectonics became accepted scientific theory, Leonardo believed that mountains had previously formed sea beds, which were gradually lifted until they formed mountains.
- The movement of water. This is the main topic of the Codex Leicester. Among other things, Leonardo wrote about the flow of water in rivers and how it is affected by different obstacles put in its way. He made recommendations about bridge construction and erosion from his observations.
- The luminosity of the Moon. Leonardo speculated that the Moon's surface is covered by water, reflecting the Sun's light. In this model, waves on the water's surface cause the light to be reflected in many directions, explaining why the Moon is not as bright as the Sun. Leonardo explained that the pale glow on the dark portion of the crescent Moon is caused by sunlight reflected from the Earth. Thus, he described the phenomenon of planetshine one hundred years before the German astronomer Johannes Kepler proved it.

The codex consists of 18 sheets of paper, each folded in half and written on both sides, forming the complete 72-page document. At one time the sheets were bound together, but they are now displayed separately. It was handwritten in Italian by Leonardo, using his characteristic mirror writing, and supported by copious drawings and diagrams.

== History ==
=== Historical owners ===
- Guglielmo della Porta, Michelangelo's student (?)
- Giuseppe Ghezzi (until 1719)
- Thomas Coke, 1st Earl of Leicester (1719–1759)
- Leicester estate (1759–1980)

=== Codex Hammer ===
The codex was purchased at auction from the Leicester estate in 1980 by the wealthy industrialist and art collector Armand Hammer, for $5.1 million (equivalent to $20 million in 2025); he later renamed the notebook the Codex Hammer. Hammer commissioned Leonardo da Vinci scholar Carlo Pedretti to compile the loose pages of the codex back into its original form. Over the next seven years, Pedretti translated each page to English, completing the project in 1987.

=== Bill Gates ===
The codex was sold to Bill Gates by Christie's auction house on 11 November 1994 in New York for US$30,802,500. Until 2021, the codex remained the most expensive book ever sold.

After Gates acquired the codex, he had its pages scanned into digital image files, some of which were later distributed as screensaver and wallpaper files on a CD-ROM as part of a Microsoft Plus! for Windows 95 desktop theme, which would later be included with Windows 98 and Windows ME. A comprehensive CD-ROM version (titled Leonardo da Vinci) was released by Corbis in 1997.

The Codex Leicester has been unbound and each page individually mounted between glass panes. It is on public display once a year in a different city worldwide. In 2000, it was displayed at Sydney's Powerhouse Museum. In 2004, it was exhibited in the Château de Chambord, and 2005 in Tokyo. One page was exhibited at the Seattle Museum of Flight's 2006 exhibit Leonardo da Vinci: Man, Inventor, Genius. From June to August 2007, the codex was the centerpiece of a two-month exhibition hosted by the Chester Beatty Library in Dublin. The codex was on view at the Phoenix Art Museum in Phoenix, Arizona, from 24 January 2015 to 12 April 2015 for the exhibition Leonardo Da Vinci's Codex Leicester and the Power of Observation. Its presentation at the Phoenix Art Museum was the first time a work by Leonardo was displayed in Arizona. The codex was then on view at the Minneapolis Institute of Arts in an exhibition Leonardo Da Vinci, the Codex Leicester, and the Creative Mind that opened 21 June 2015, where it remained on display until 30 August 2015. As part of the same tour, the Codex Leicester was also on display at the North Carolina Museum of Art in Raleigh, North Carolina from 31 October 2015 to 17 January 2016.

For the 500th anniversary of Leonardo's death, the Codex Leicester was on display from 29 October 2018 to 20 January 2019 in Florence at the Aula Magliabechiana of the Uffizi.

== See also ==
- List of most expensive books and manuscripts
- List of works by Leonardo da Vinci
- Codex Atlanticus
- Codex Arundel
- Shahnameh of Shah Tahmasp

== See also ==
- Codex Windsor
