= Codex Arundel =

Book by Leonardo da Vinci

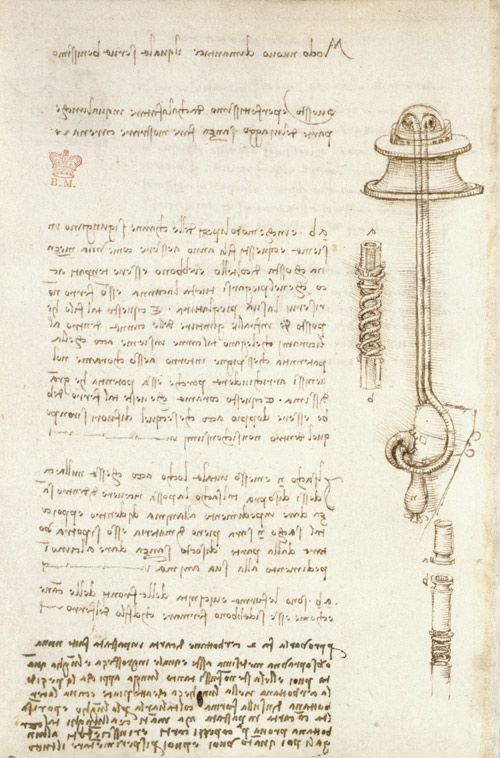
Fol 24v from Codex Arundel: study of an underwater breathing device for divers

Codex Arundel (British Library Arundel MS 263) is a bound collection of pages of notes written by Leonardo da Vinci and dating mostly from between 1480 and 1518. The codex contains a number of treatises on a variety of subjects, including mechanics and geometry. The name of the codex came from the Earl of Arundel, who acquired it in Spain in the 1630s. It forms part of the British Library Arundel Manuscripts.

== Description ==
The manuscript contains 283 paper leaves of various sizes, most of them around 22 cm × 16 cm. Only a few of the leaves are blank. Two folios, 100 and 101, were incorrectly numbered twice. The codex is a collection of Leonardo's manuscripts originating from every period in his working life, a span of 40 years from 1478 to 1518. It contains short treatises, notes and drawings on a variety of subjects from mechanics to the flight of birds. From Leonardo's text, it appears that he gathered the pages together, with the intention of ordering and possibly publishing them. Leonardo customarily used a single folio sheet of paper for each subject, so that each folio presented as a small cohesive treatise on an aspect of the subject, spread across both back and front of a number of pages. This arrangement has been lost by later book binders who have cut the folios into pages and laid them on top of each other, thereby separating many subjects into several sections and resulting in an arrangement which appears random.

It is similar to the Codex Leicester, which is also a compilation of the notes, diagrams and sketches. The Codex Arundel is recognized as second in importance to the Codex Atlanticus.

== History ==
The manuscript was written in Italy at the end of the 15th century and the beginning of the 16th century. Most of the pages can be dated to between 1480 and 1518.

The manuscript was purchased in the early 17th century by Thomas Howard, 2nd Earl of Arundel (1585–1646), art collector and politician. His grandson, Henry Howard, 6th Duke of Norfolk (1628–1684), presented it to the newly-founded Royal Society in 1667. The manuscript was first catalogued in 1681 by William Perry, a librarian, as a scientific and mathematical notebook.

It was purchased by the British Museum from the Royal Society along with 549 other Arundel manuscripts (half of Arundel's collection) in 1831. It was catalogued by the British Museum in 1834. It remained in the British Library as MS Arundel 263 when the library separated from the British Museum in 1973.

The most recent facsimile was published in 1998. On 30 January 2007 the manuscript became part of the British Library's project "Turning the Pages", when it was digitised along with Codex Leicester, and became available in the 2.0 format. These two manuscript of Leonardo notebooks were reunited online.

== See also ==
- List of works by Leonardo da Vinci
- Codex Atlanticus
- Codex Leicester
- Codex Urbinas
