= LANL Research Library =

- 35.87558°N 106.32277°W
- Location: Los Alamos, New Mexico

Collection
- Size: 150,000

Other information
- Website: http://www.lanl.gov/library/

The LANL Research Library is a research library at Los Alamos National Laboratory. It contains a substantial collection of books, journals, databases, patents along with technical reports. Additionally it offers literature searching, training, and outreach services. The library has a research and development (R&D) component, which works in areas such as open archives, recommendation systems (including visualization), emergency response information systems, and discovery systems. Its stated mission is to deliver effective and responsive knowledge services, thereby connecting people with information, technology, and resources. Its stated purpose (vision) is essential knowledge services for national security sciences. (Note: Unless otherwise indicated, this information has been authored by an employee or employees of Triad National Security, LLC, operator of the Los Alamos National Laboratory under Contract No. 89233218CNA000001 with the National Nuclear Security Agency (NNSA) of the U.S. Department of Energy (DOE). The U.S. Government has rights to use, reproduce, and distribute this information. The public may copy and use this information without charge, provided that this Notice and any statement of authorship are reproduced on all copies.)

== Collections ==
The library houses some 150,000 volumes and 1.5 million unclassified reports on a wide variety of technical subjects pertaining to science, mathematics, and engineering.

There is also an associated online collection of physical science journals, and over 30 terabytes of data is stored locally. There is an abstract server with abstracts for papers submitted to peer reviewed journals prior to their acceptance and publication.

The LANL Research library has, in its collections, 10,000 journals with 150,000 bound journal volumes, and an additional 8,500 electronic journals. Its book collection contains 100,000 print titles, 150,000 print volumes, and an additional 30,000 electronic book titles. The library lists 35 subscription abstracting and index databases, along with an additional 100 open-access databases. Its locally loaded database contains more than 93 million records. 1,327 LANL patents are also listed, in PDF format.

Subject coverage of the electronic journals collection encompasses Agriculture, Astronomy & Astrophysics, Bioinformatics, Genetics, Chemistry, Computer Science, Defense/Military, Earth Sciences, Engineering, Environment, Government and Legal, Health and Safety, Humanities, Information and Library Science, International Affairs, Materials Science, Mathematics, Medicine, Nanotechnology, Physics, and Social Sciences.

The National Security Research Center (NSRC) contains additional documents, resources, and services specifically related to the Manhattan Project.

== Public access ==
General public access is available. General access is permitted for the library's book and journal collections, the electronic databases, and the electronic books and journal articles that are available to the Lab. However, other restrictions apply. (Note: The Research Library is open to the general public 9 a.m. - 4:00 p.m., Monday through Friday. However, visitors will not have access to technical reports in print or microfiche. In addition, it remains open to laboratory badge holders 24/7. A self check out system is used to allow patrons to check out items even when the library is not staffed. It is located in the J. Robert Oppenheimer Study Center in TA-3 (Technical Area 3), across from the Otowi building.)
