= Palazzo Pozzi Besana, Milan =

Italian neoclassical palace

The Palazzo Pozzi Besana is a Neoclassical style palace in Milan, region of Lombardy, Italy. Constructed in 1815 using designs by Giovanni Battista Piuri and Piero Portaluppi. It is adjacent to the Casa degli Omenoni.

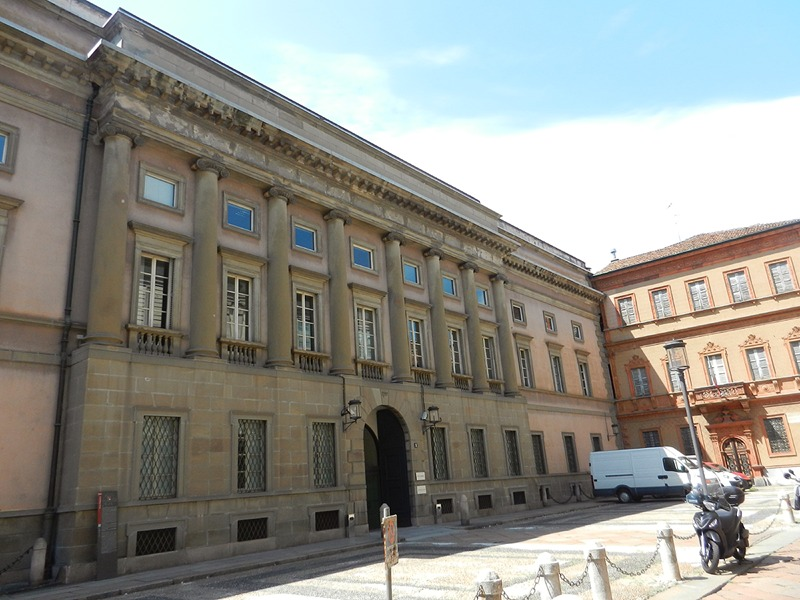
Palazzo Pozzi-Besana
