= Codex Atlanticus =

Set of drawings and writings by Leonardo da Vinci

- Biblioteca Ambrosiana
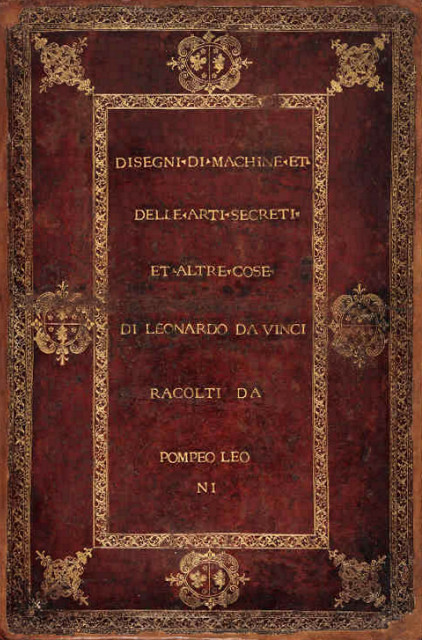
- Type: Codex
- Date: 1478–1519
- Language: Italian
- Author: Leonardo da Vinci
- Compiled by: Pompeo Leoni
- Contents: 1,119 paper leaves (2,238 pages); 12 volumes
- Previously kept: Leonardo da Vinci → Francesco Melzi → Orazio Melzi → Pompeo Leoni → Biblioteca Ambrosiana → Institut de France → Biblioteca Ambrosiana

The Codex Atlanticus (Atlantic Codex) is a 12-volume, bound set of drawings and writings (in Italian) by Leonardo da Vinci, the largest single set. Its name indicates the large paper used to preserve original Leonardo notebook pages, which was used for atlases. It comprises 1,119 leaves dating from 1478 to 1519, the contents covering a great variety of subjects, from flight to weaponry to musical instruments and from mathematics to botany. This codex was gathered in the late 16th century by the sculptor Pompeo Leoni, who dismembered some of Leonardo's notebooks in its formation. It is now in the Biblioteca Ambrosiana in Milan.

== Description ==
The Codex Atlanticus is the largest single collection of drawings and writings (in Italian) by polymath Leonardo da Vinci, containing 1,119 paper leaves (2,238 pages) (Note: Sheets are written on the front and back) arranged into 12 leather-bound volumes. Its size and scope has led art historian Carlo Pedretti to recognize it as the most important of Leonardo's manuscripts. The pages are in various sizes, "from folded sheets to minute fragments." They range from 1478 to 1519 and cover Leonardo's entire professional career through Florence, Milan, Rome, and Amboise.

== Contents ==
The codex contains drawings and writings on a diverse range of subjects, including studies and sketches for paintings, works on mechanics, hydraulics, mathematics, astronomy as well as philosophical meditations and fables. It also has many inventions such as parachutes, war machineries and hydraulic pumps.

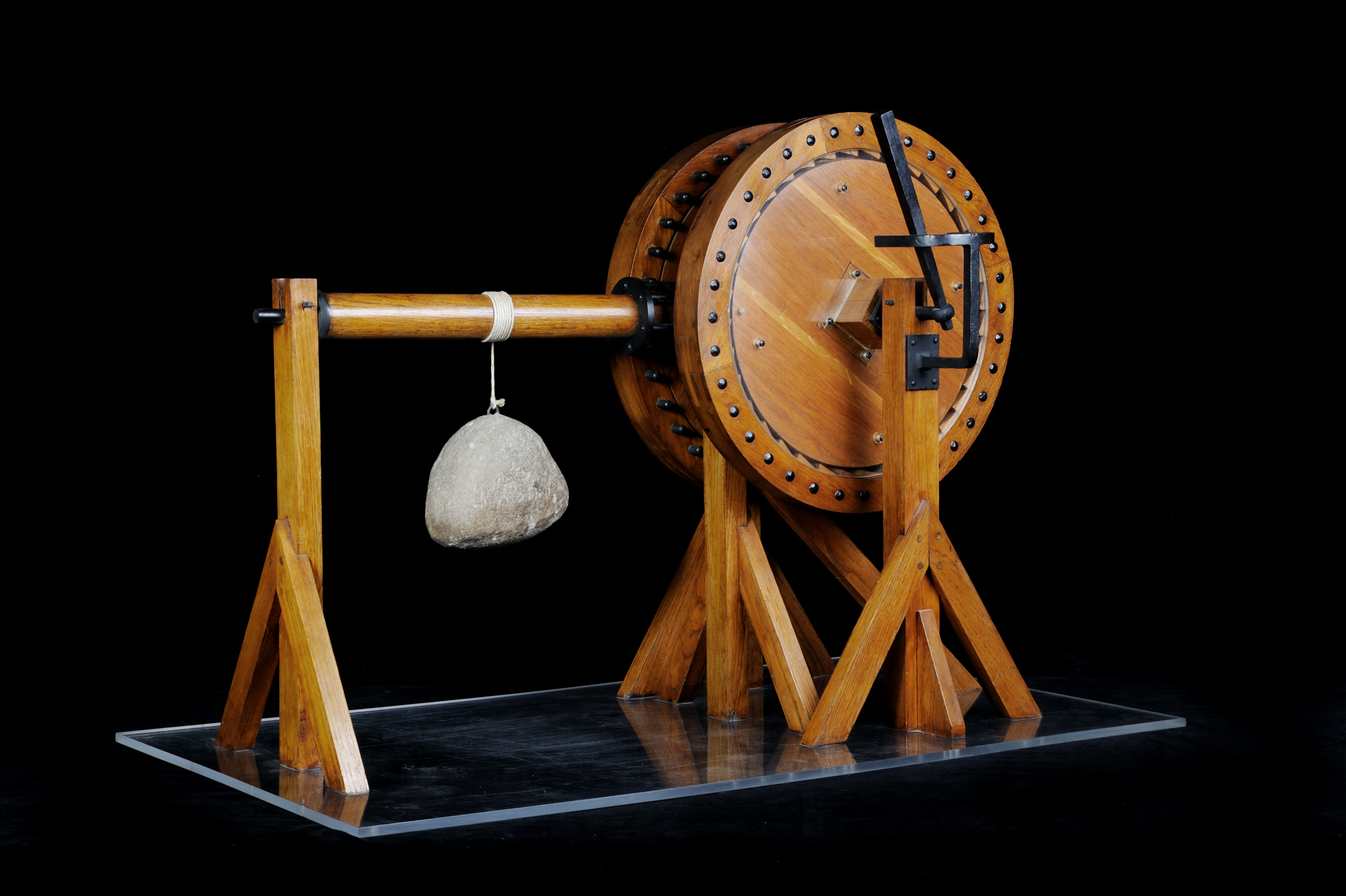
Hoist by Leonardo da Vinci (Codex Atlanticus, f. 30v., 1480 ca.). Reconstruction at the Museo nazionale della scienza e della tecnologia Leonardo da Vinci, Milan.

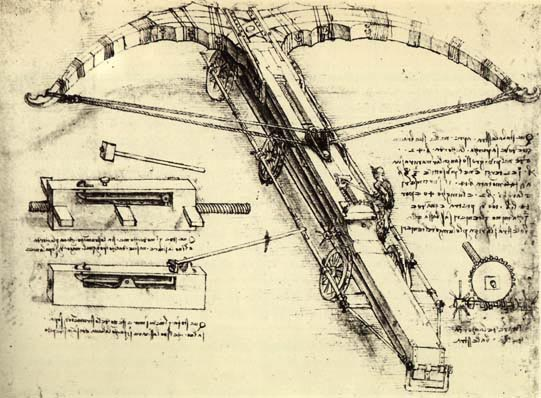
Design for a giant crossbow

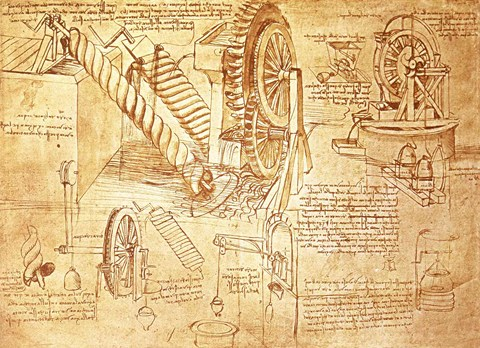
Waterwheels and Archimedean screws

== History ==
Leonardo composed the 1,119 leaves later collected in the Codex Atlanticus from 1478 to 1519. His notebooks—originally loose papers of different types and sizes, were largely entrusted to his pupil and heir Francesco Melzi after the master's death. These were to be published, a task of overwhelming difficulty because of its scope and Leonardo's idiosyncratic writing. After Melzi's death in 1570, the collection passed to his son, the lawyer Orazio, who initially took little interest in the journals. In 1587, a Melzi household tutor named Lelio Gavardi took 13 of the manuscripts to Florence, intending to offer them to the grand duke of Tuscany. However, following Francesco I de' Medici's untimely death, Gavardi took them to Pisa to give to his relative Aldus Manutius the Younger; there, Giovanni Magenta reproached Gavardi for having taken the manuscripts illicitly and returned them to Orazio. Having many more such works in his possession, Orazio gifted the 13 volumes to Magenta. News spread of these lost works of Leonardo's, and Orazio retrieved seven of the 13 manuscripts, which he then gave to Pompeo Leoni for publication in two volumes; one of these was the Codex Atlanticus. Leoni dismembered some of Leonardo's notebooks in the formation of the codex, gathering the original leaves into 1,222 pages.

When Napoleon conquered Milan in 1796, he seized about a dozen Leonardo manuscripts including the Codex and sent them to Paris, saying that "all men of genius ... are French, whatever the country which has given them birth." The manuscript was returned to Milan at the end of the Napoleonic Wars, but the other manuscripts remain in the Paris Institut de France.

The codex was restored and rebound by the Basilian monks working in the Laboratory for the Restoration of Ancient Books and Manuscripts of the Exarchic Greek Abbey of St. Mary of Grottaferrata from 1968 to 1972.

In April 2006, Carmen Bambach of the Metropolitan Museum of Art in New York City discovered an extensive invasion of molds of various colors, including black, red, and purple, along with swelling of pages. Monsignor Gianfranco Ravasi—then the head of the Ambrosian Library, now head of the Pontifical Council for Culture at the Vatican—alerted the Italian conservation institute, the Opificio delle Pietre Dure, in Florence. In October 2008, it was determined that the colors found on the pages were not the product of mold, but were instead caused by mercury salts added to protect the Codex from mold. Moreover, the staining appears to be not on the codex but on later cartonage. Later in April 2006, the Codex Atlanticus was publicly displayed in Tokyo, Japan, until August, for an exhibition with the Leonardo3 Museum: "The Virtual Codex Atlanticus".

In 2019, an interactive website has been launched that allows exploration of the Codex Atlanticus in its entirety and to organize its 1,119 pages by subject, year and page number. 12 drawings of the Codex Atlanticus were on display at the Martin Luther King Jr. Memorial Library in Washington, D.C. from June 21, 2023, until August 20, 2023.

== See also ==
- List of works by Leonardo da Vinci
- Codex Arundel
- Codex Leicester
- Casa degli Omenoni
- Leonardo's world map
- Octant projection
- Codex Windsor

== Sources ==
Books

- Major, Richard Henry (1866). Archaeologia, or, Miscellaneous tracts relating to antiquity. London, England: Society of Antiquaries of London.
- Pedretti, Carlo (1978). The Codex Atlanticus of Leonardo Da Vinci. San Diego, California: Harcourt. ISBN 978-3840950032.
- Wallace, Robert (1972) [1966]. The World of Leonardo: 1452–1519. New York, New York: Time-Life Books. ISBN 978-0316509206.

Journals and articles

- "Officials Report Mold in a Leonardo Collection". The New York Times. New York, New York. Associated Press. 23 December 2007.
- Taggart, Emma (16 May 2019). "All 1,119 Pages of Leonardo Da Vinci's "Codex Atlanticus" Now Available Online". My Modern Metropolis.

Web

- "Codex Atlanticus". Milan, Lombardy: Veneranda Biblioteca Ambrosiana. Archived from the original on October 6, 2018.
- "Lab for the Restoration of Ancient Books and Manuscripts". Grottaferrata, Metropolitan City of Rome Capital: Order of Basilian Monks in Italy. Archived from the original on 2017-07-25.
- Pedretti, Carlo (1998). "Introduction to Leonardo's Codex Arundel" (PDF). London, England: British Library. Archived from the original (PDF) on 2019-12-07.
- "The Mystery of the Codex Atlanticus. Leonardo at the Ambrosiana". Milan, Lombardy: Veneranda Biblioteca Ambrosiana.
