= Besana Group =

The Besana Group is a company that produces, processes and commercialises nuts and dried fruit. It has various production plants in Italy and abroad (over 2,000 in total).

Thanks to their strong relationships with the primary food industries, the group achieves a turnover of about €115 million., with 75% of their production being exported from Italy.

The Besana Group produces more than 16,000 tons of nuts and dried fruit every year with a total of 400 highly skilled employees and workers in Italy and further 300 abroad.

== History ==
In 1921, Emilio Besana and his brother Vincenzo founded "Emilio Besana & Co.", a name which was turned into "Besana Group" 80 years later. The company became a major force within the market place within a short period of time.

In the 1930s the Besana brothers expanded to America and into the Far East. A new plant was built in San Gennaro Vesuviano, which is still the main site of the Besana Group to this day.

Throughout its history the Besana Group has been known to invest in the most up to date equipment available at the time. On top of that, it has always been a major employer within the Campania region.

From the 1950s to the 1960s, Besana Group expanded its product range, starting with almonds from the Italian regions of Apulia and Sicily in the 1950s, then in the early 1960s with Brazil nuts, Pecan nuts, dried fruit, seeds, pistachios, pine kernels, Macadamia nuts, and finally the snack lines.

From the 1970s the company's market share continued to strengthen both nationally and internationally.

- 1989: Besana UK. Limited opens - to introduce processed products to UK (multiples) and Northern Europe (multiples and processing sector)
- 1988: partnership with Uno Moc, an organisation for both fresh and processed products
- 2000: partnership with "Almaverde Bio", a consortium for the promotion, production and sale of organic produce.
- 2002: partnership with Mediterranean Fruit Company (M.F.C), a consortium promoting the Italian fruit and vegetable sector outside the Italian market.
- 2003: partnership with "Made in Blu Trading", a consortium promoting Italian high quality produce outside the Italian market.
