= Antonio Abondio =

Italian sculptor

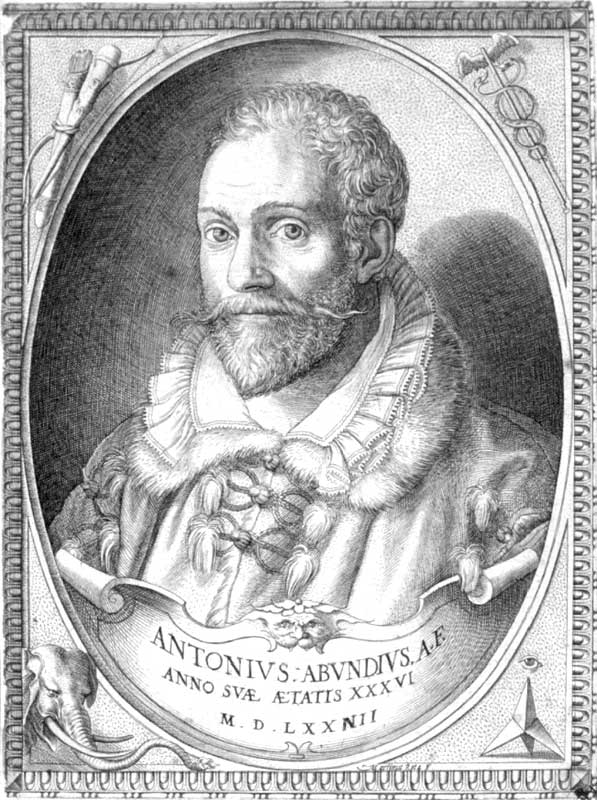
Portrait of Antonio Abondio by Martino Rota, 1574

Antonio Abondio (1538–1591) was an Italian sculptor, best known as a medallist and as the pioneer of the coloured wax relief portrait miniature.

Born in Riva del Garda, he was trained by Leone Leoni and worked in Italy between 1552 and 1565. Thereafter he mainly worked for the Habsburgs, with a few works made for French and Polish kings. He moved to Vienna to the court of Emperor Maximilian I and after his death in 1576 to Prague. He travelled to France, Netherlands and Germany. He died at Vienna in 1591.

His son Alessandro followed in his father's footsteps, also specializing in mythological and portrait reliefs, and marrying the widow of another court artist, Hans von Aachen.

== Work ==
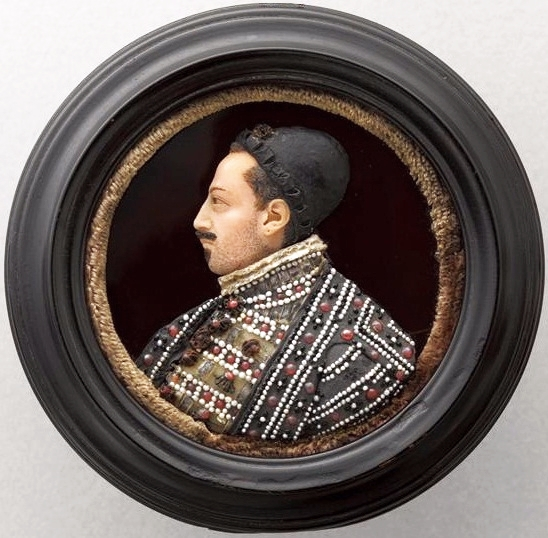
Wax miniature of King Henry III of France, c. 1590

Thirteen of Abondio's wax portraits survive, usually made on a round black slate base, decorated with tiny pearls and precious stones. He made about sixty portrait medals, with a portrait on the obverse and an allegory on the reverse side, some of them have silver enamelled framing. He also made the dies for the first coinage of Emperor Rudolf II. Initially his style in metal followed that of Leone Leoni, for the facade of whose house in Milan (Casa degli Omenoni) he carved eight large atlantes in stone, but later included many other influences.

== Sources ==
- George Francis Hill: Portrait Medals of Italian Artists of the Renaissance, London 1912, p. 72, 75
- Beket Bukovinská-Eliška Fučíková-Ivan P. Muchka: Die Kunst am Hofe Rudols II. Prag 1991, pp. 151, 155–156, 163.
