= Marcantonio della Torre =

Italian anatomist

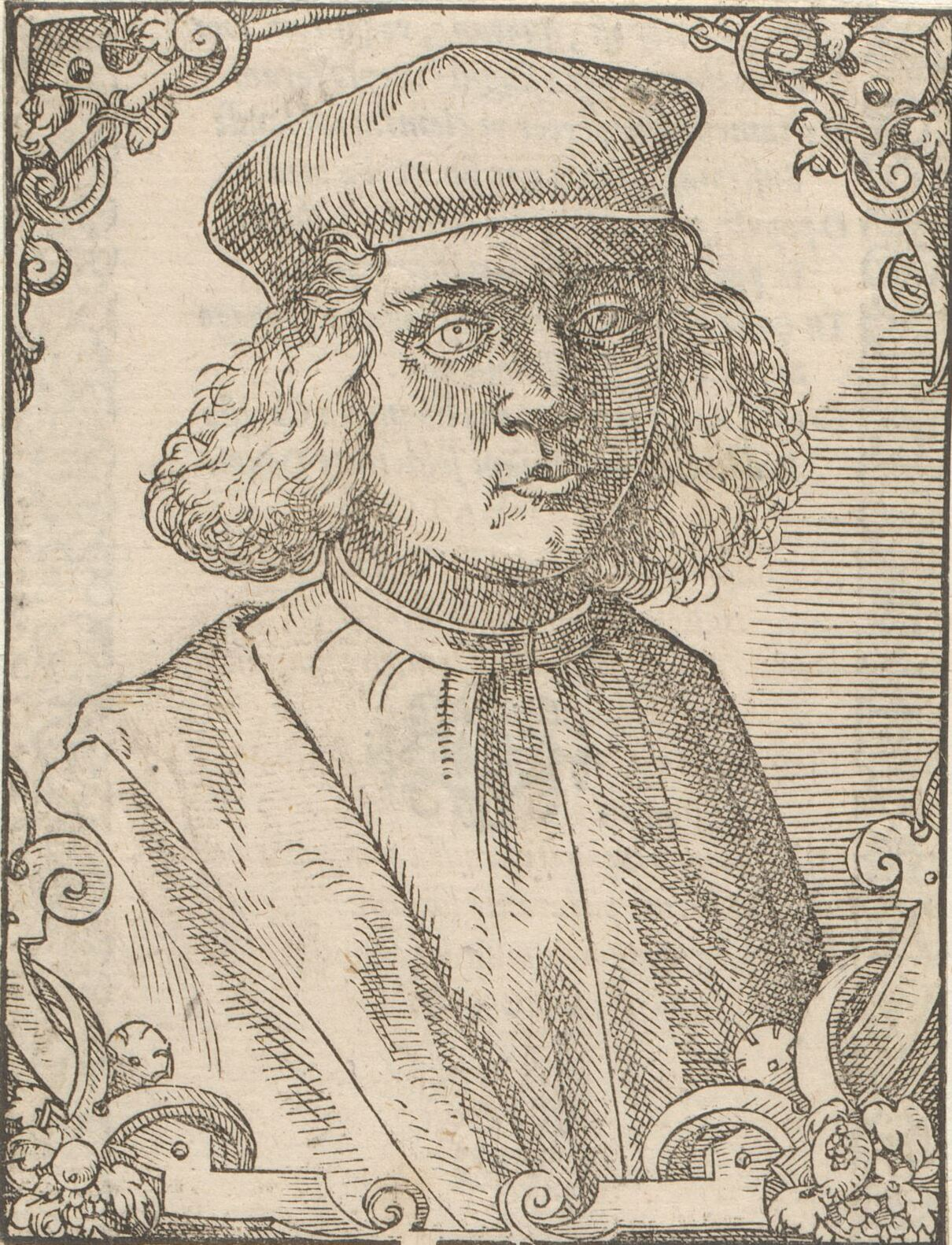
Portrait of Marcantonio della Torre by Tobias Stimmer

Marcantonio della Torre (1481–1511) was a Renaissance Professor of Anatomy who lectured at the University of Pavia and at the University of Padua. It is believed that della Torre and Leonardo da Vinci, who studied human anatomy by dissecting corpses, were intending to publish a book, but this did not eventuate as della Torre's life was cut short by plague in 1511. By this time Leonardo had made over 750 detailed anatomical drawings with annotations. Both Giorgio Vasari and Paolo Giovio claim that della Torre had written anatomical texts, but none are known to have survived to the modern age.

== See also ==
Science and inventions of Leonardo da Vinci
