= Pompeo Leoni =

Italian sculptor and medalist

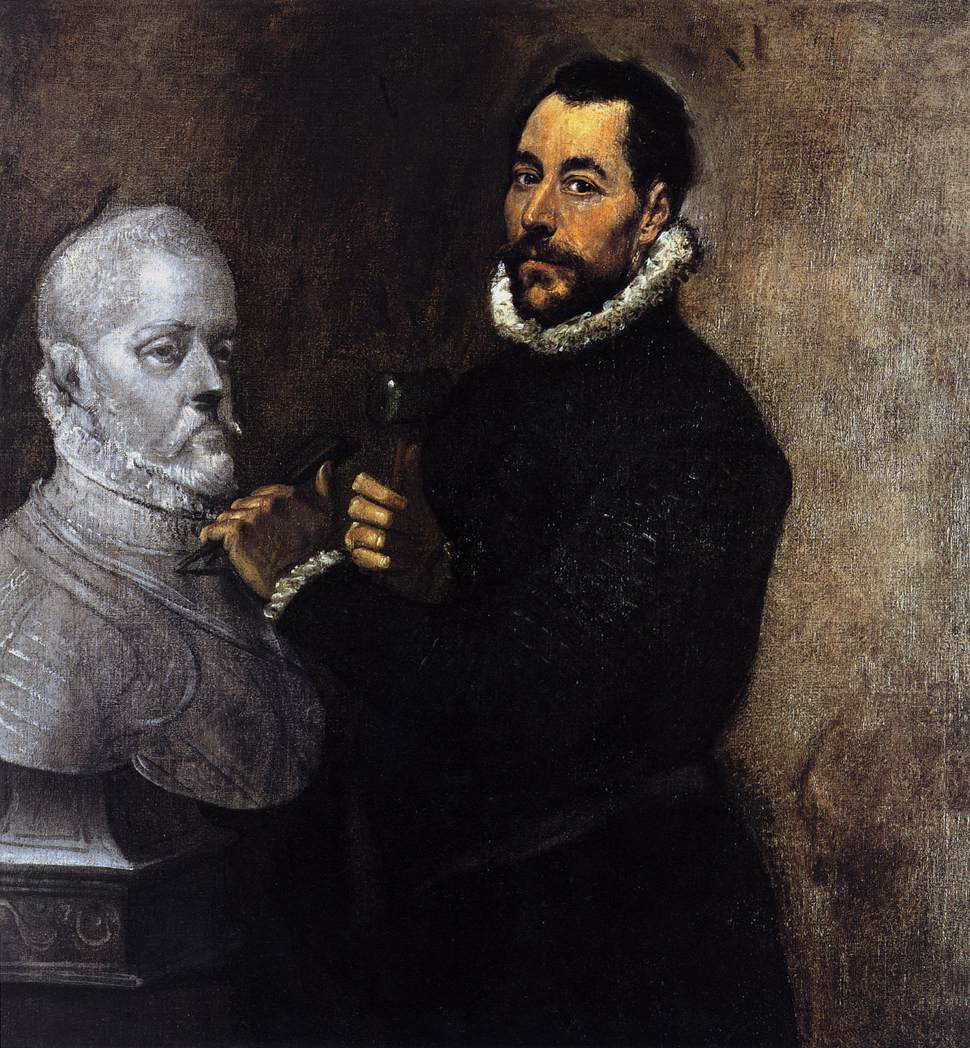
- Born: Early 1530s Milan
- Died: October, 1608; Madrid
- Occupations: Sculptor, medallist, art collector.

Pompei Leoni was an Italian sculptor and medalist who was born in Milan in the early 1530s and died in Madrid in October 1608.

== Biography ==
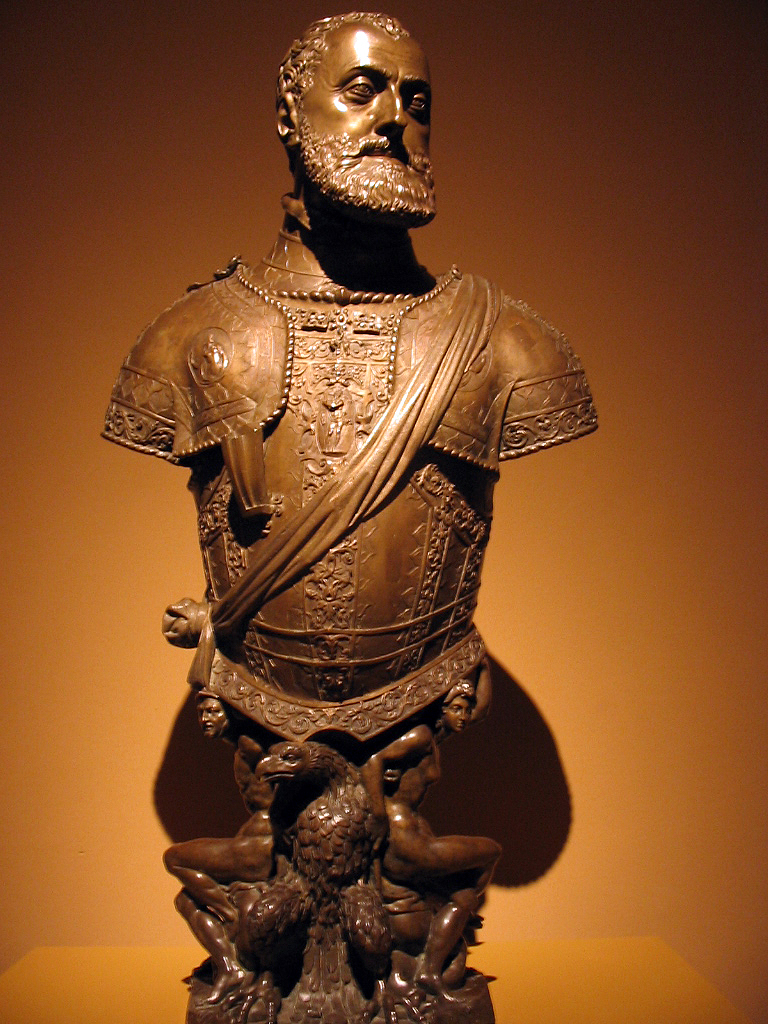
Leone and Pompeo Leoni, Bust of Charles V, Madrid, Prado.

Pompeo learned the art of sculpture and medal making in the house of his father, Leone Leoni, in Milan, called the Casa degli Omenoni, where he had set up a school In addition to his Milanese customers, Pompeo, like his father, worked mainly for the Spanish monarchy. In particular, he collaborated with the sculptors Jacopo Nizzola, Bautista Comane, and Juan Bautista Monegro on the construction of the Escorial. Most of his sculptures are preserved in Spain.

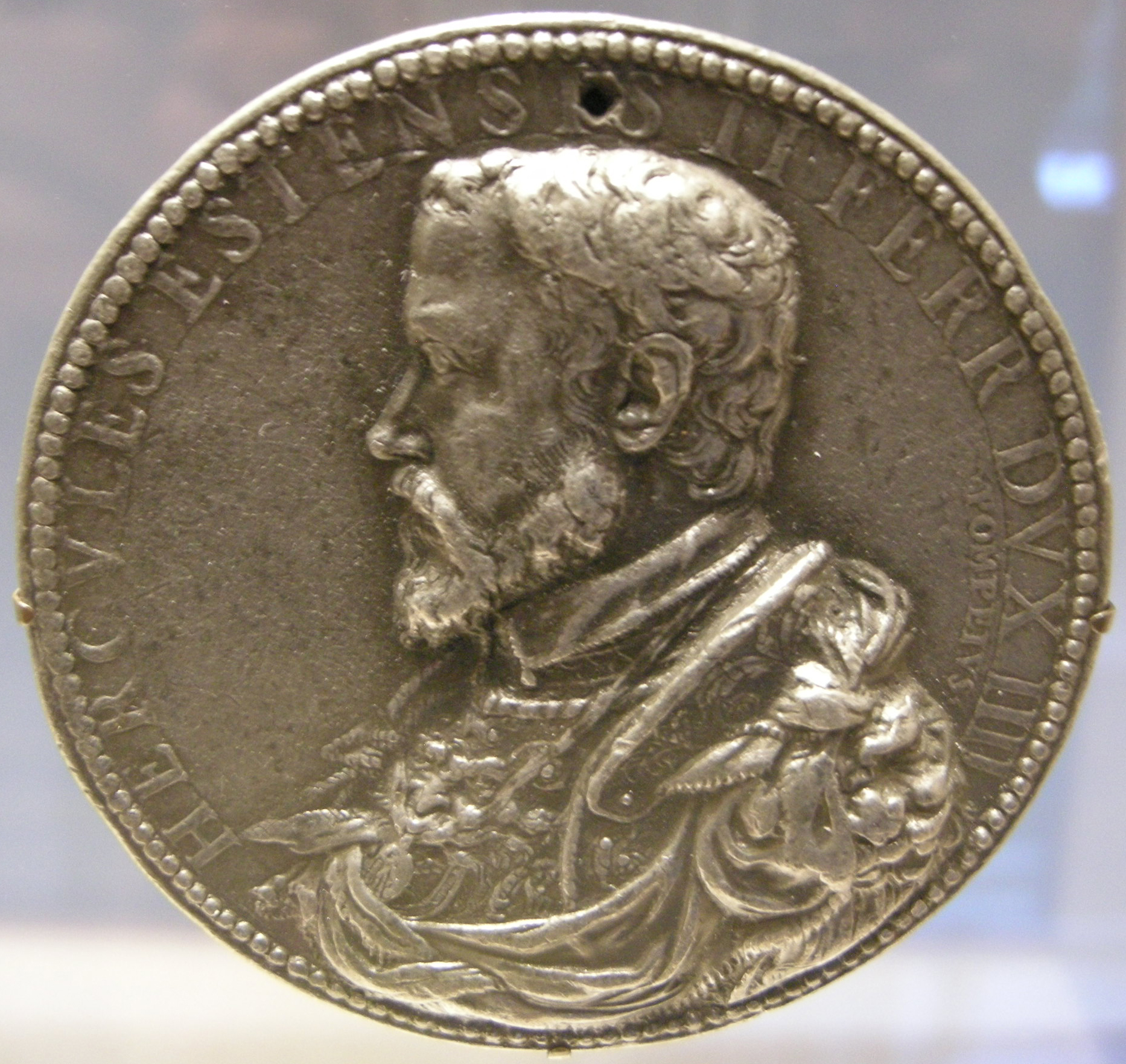
Pompeo Leoni, Medal of Ercole II d'Este, 1554.

At his father's request, he amassed an important art collection. In his Trattato dell'arte de la pittura, published in 1584, Giovanni Paolo Lomazzo states that two mythological paintings by Correggio, Jupiter et Io and Danaë (now in the Kunsthistorisches Museum in Vienna and the Galleria Borghese in Rome, respectively), sent by Pompey from Lombardy, Spain, were preserved in the Leoni household in Milan. It is not known whether he received the works from the sovereign himself or whether he bought them from his favorite Antonio Perez after his disgrace in 1579.

=== Leonardo da Vinci's manuscripts ===
In 1589, he came into possession of the notebooks, manuscripts, and drawings that Leonardo da Vinci had bequeathed to his pupil Francesco Melzi. When this latter died in 1570, his son Orazio Melzi distributed the manuscripts; he sold some and gave others to friends and collectors. Pompeo Leoni received some from Melzi and bought others.

In 1630, Giovanni Magenta wrote about the distribution of Leonardo's manuscripts, accusing Pompeo Leoni of being one of the main culprits and of having altered their order. To distinguish between artistic and technical or scientific drawings, Leoni dismantled the original manuscripts and created two separate collections: the first, Disegni di Machine e delle Arti Secreti et Altre Cose di Leonardo da Vinci Racolti da Pompeo Leoni, grouped scientific and technical drawings, this is the Codex Atlanticus kept at the Biblioteca Ambrosiana in Milan. The second, Disegni di Leonardo da Vinci restaurati da Pompeo Leoni, was intended to group botanical and anatomical drawings; it has been dismantled and the sheets can be found in several European collections, such as the Codex Windsor in the Royal Collection of Windsor Castle since the 17th century, and the Codex Madrid in the National Library of Spain.

== Works ==
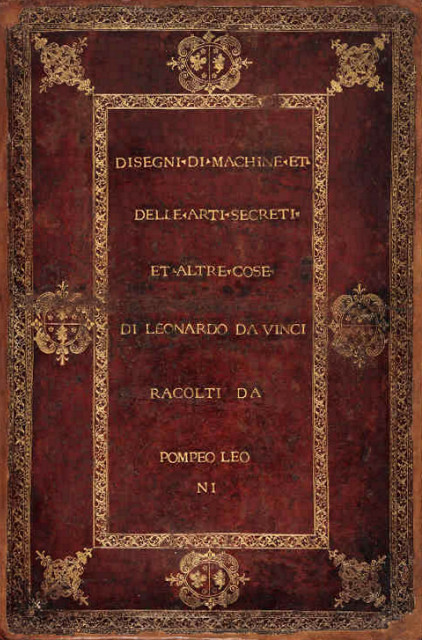
Binding of the Codex Atlanticus.

=== Sculptures ===
- Tombstone of the Marquis of Las Navas del Marqués.
- Bust of Charles V (in collaboration with his father).
- Statue of Charles V defeating heresy, Madrid, Prado Museum.
- Alabaster tomb of the inquisitor and archbishop of Seville, Fernando de Valdés, 1576-1582, in the collegiate church of Santa María la Mayor in Salas (Asturias).
- Monumental group for the mausoleum of Charles V and Philip II, in the monastery of San Lorenzo de El Escorial; partly sculpted in Milan in collaboration with Adrien de Vries and assembled in the basilica in 1587.
- Tomb of Cardinal Espinosa de los Monteros in the parish church of Martín Muñoz de las Posadas in Segovia.
- White marble statue of Joan of Austria at prayer in the Monasterio de las Descalzas Reales, Madrid.
- Statue of Antonio de Sotelo y Cisneros at prayer in the church of San Andrés, Zamora.
- Marble bust of Philip II (Metropolitan Museum, New York).
- Tombstone of Pedro Dávila y Zúñigae de María de Córdoba, in the convent of San Domenico and San Paolo in Las Navas del Marqués (preserved in Madrid's National Archaeological Museum).
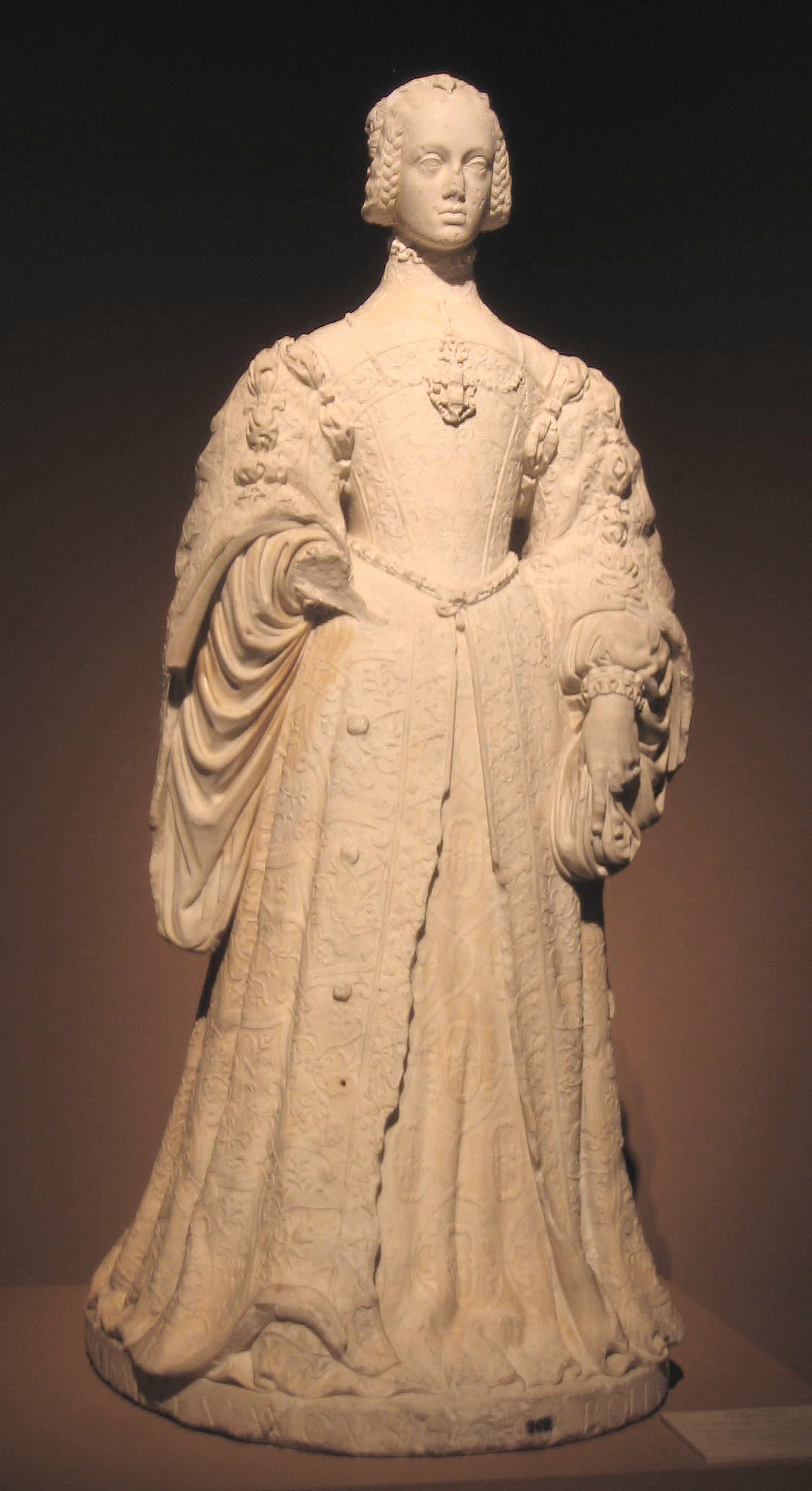
- Isabella of Portugal
  Cristo de las Mercedes, an image shown during Holy Week processions in Valladolid, belonging to the Cofradía de las Siete Palabras.
- Statue of Isabella of Portugal (Madrid, Prado).

=== Medals ===
- Bronze medal by Francisco Fernández de Liébana, 1575: one in Milan, Pinacoteca del Castello Sforzesco, another in Madrid, Prado Museum.

== Bibliography ==
- Plon, Eugène (1887). Les maîtres italiens au service de la maison d'Autriche : Leone Leoni, sculpteur de Charles-Quint, et Pompeo Leoni, sculpteur de Philippe II (in French). Paris: Librairie Plon, Nourrit et Cie. doi:10.11588/diglit.68769.
- Johnson, Cesare; Martini, Rodolfo (1995). Catalogo delle medaglie. II, Secolo XVI. Benvenuto Cellino, Pompeo Leoni : Milano, Civiche raccolte numismatiche (in Italian). Istituto Poligrafico e Zecca dello Stato. ISBN 9788824038317.
- Cupperi, Walter (2005). "LEONI, Pompeo". TRECCANI (in Italian).
- Schröder, Stephan F. (2012). Leone & Pompeo Leoni : actas del Congreso Internacional = proceedings of the International Symposium (in Spanish). Madrid: Museo Nacional del Prado. ISBN 978-84-8480-247-1.
