= Ana (given name) =

Ana (Cyrillic: Ана) is a version of the female given name Anna meaning "favour" or "grace".

In Croatia, the name Ana was the second most common feminine given name, or among the top ten most common, in almost all decades for which there is census data.

== People ==
- Ana (American singer) (born 1974), Cuban-born American singer
- Ana Francisca Abarca de Bolea (1602–1685), Spanish writer and poet
- Ana María Abello (born 1979), Colombian actress
- Ana Abina (born 1997), Slovenian handball player
- Ana Luisa Abraham (born 2010), Mexican rhythmic gymnast
- Ana Abraido-Lanza, American behavioral psychologist
- Ana Abrunhosa (born 1970), Portuguese politician
- Ana Achúcarro (born 1962), Spanish astroparticle physicist
- Ana Acosta (born 1961), Argentine actress and comedian
- Ana Acuña (born 1994), Paraguayan handball player
- Ana Afonso (1976–2024), Portuguese model and actress
- Ana-Maria Afuie (born 1997), Samoan rugby union player
- Ana Aguayo (born 1993), Mexican flag football and basketball player
- Ana Paola Agudelo García (born 1983), Colombian economist and politician
- Ana Beatriz García, Spanish actress
- Ana Carolina Aguilera (born 1981), Argentine swimmer
- Ana María Aguilera, Spanish statistician
- Ana Laura Aláez, Basque artist
- Ana de Alba (born 1979), American judge
- Ana Alcaide, Spanish musician
- Ana Alcázar (born 1979), Spanish tennis player
- Ana Alegria (born 1977), Portuguese swimmer
- Ana Alexander (athlete) (born 1954), Cuban long jumper
- Ana Alicia (born 1956), Mexican-American actress
- Ana Karen Allende, Mexican artisan
- Ana Almansa (born 1963), Spanish tennis player
- Ana Almirón (born 1984), Argentine politician
- Ana Isabel Alonso (born 1963), Spanish long-distance runner
- Ana Alós (born 1969), Spanish politician
- Ana María Alvarado (born 1968), Mexican journalist
- Ana Ida Alvares (born 1965), Brazilian volleyball player
- Ana Álvarez (born 1969), Spanish actress and model
- Ana Belén Álvaro (born 1969), Spanish basketball player
- Ana Paula Alves (born 1970), Brazilian sitting volleyball player
- Ana Amado (1946–2016), Argentine journalist and academic
- Ana Filomena Amaral (born 1961), Portuguese writer
- Ana Luísa Amaral (1956–2022), Portuguese poet and academic
- Ana Ambrazienė (1955–2025), Lithuanian hurdler
- Ana Amicarella (born 1966), Venezuelan synchronized swimmer
- Ana Lily Amirpour (born 1980), American filmmaker, screenwriter and actress
- Ana Amorim (born 1983), Brazilian handball player
- Ana Andreazza, Brazilian-Canadian pharmacologist
- Ana Antonijević (born 1987), Serbian volleyball player
- Ana Sofia Antunes (born 1981), Portuguese politician
- Ana Mercedes Aponte, Venezuelan politician
- Ana Teresa Aranda (born 1954), Mexican politician
- Ana Lucia Araujo (born 1971), American author and history professor
- Ana Paula Araújo, several people
- Ana Arbizú y Flores (1825–1903), Honduran poet
- Ana Arce (born 1964), Andorran photographer and curler
- Ana Maria Archila, Colombian-American activist and politician
- Ana Paula Arendt, Brazilian diplomat
- Ana María Arévalo Gosen (born 1988), Venezuelan photographer
- Ana Claudia Arias, American physicist
- Ana María Arias (born 1946), Chilean tennis player
- Ana de Armas (born 1988), Cuban actress
- Ana Lucía Armijos (born 1949), Ecuadorian politician and economist
- Ana Arnau (born 2005), Spanish rhythmic gymnast
- Ana Arneodo, Argentine actress
- Ana Paula Arósio (born 1975), Brazilian model and actress
- Ana Arregui, American linguist
- Ana Margarida Arruda, Portuguese historian and archaeologist
- Ana Arzoumanian (born 1962), Argentine lawyer, writer, poet and translator
- Ana Asenjo Garcia, professor of physics
- Ana Asensio (born 1978), Spanish actress and filmmaker
- Ana Aslan (1897–1988), Romanian biologist
- Ana Fabiola Aubone (born 1977), Argentine politician
- Ana Auther (born 1959), American actress
- Ana Liliana Avião (born 1994), Angolan model and beauty pageant titleholder
- Ana-Maria Avram (1961–2017), Romanian composer, pianist, conductor and musicologist
- Ana Ayala (born 1969), Mexican diver
- Ana Ayora (born 1983), American actress
- Ana Carolina Azevedo (born 1998), Brazilian sprinter
- Ana Flávia Azinheira (born 1977), Mozambican basketball player
- Ana Mariella Bacigalupo (born 1964), Peruvian anthropologist
- Ana Bagration-Gruzinsky (born 1976), Georgian princess
- Ana Maria Bahiana (born 1950), Brazilian-born American author, journalist and lecturer
- Ana María Baiardi (born 1965), Paraguayan diplomat and politician
- Ana Bailão (born 1976), Canadian politician and Toronto city councilor
- Ana Baletić (born 1985), Montenegrin basketball player
- Ana Maria Bamberger (born 1966), Romanian physician and playwright
- Ana Filipa Baptista (born 1990), Portuguese chess player
- Ana Eurídice Eufrosina de Barandas (1806–1863), Brazilian writer
- Ana Barati (born 1984), Iranian wrestler
- Ana Barbachan (born 1989), Brazilian sailor
- Ana Bárbara (born 1971), Mexican singer
- Ana Bărbosu (born 2006), Romanian artistic gymnast
- Ana Teresa Barboza, Peruvian textile artist
- Ana Baro (born 1992), Albanian footballer
- Ana Baron (1950–2015), Argentine writer and journalist
- Ana María Barrenechea (1913–2010), Argentinian writer
- Ana Barrios Camponovo (born 1961), Uruguayan writer and illustrator
- Ana Barros, several people
- Ana Baschwitz (1960–2022), Spanish journalist and author
- Ana Batarelo, Croatian model
- Ana Bautista (born 1972), Spanish rhythmic gymnast
- Ana Tereza Basilio (born 1967), Brazilian judge and lawyer
- Ana Beatriz (born 1985), Brazilian racing driver
- Ana Bebić (born 1986), Croatian singer
- Ana Valeria Becerril (born 1997), Mexican actress
- Ana Bedran-Russo, Brazilian dentist
- Ana-Marija Begić (born 1994), Croatian basketball player
- Ana Bekuta (born 1959), Serbian singer
- Ana Belac (born 1997), Slovenian professional golfer
- Ana Belén (born 1951), Spanish actress and singer
- Ana Belena (born 1988), Mexican actress
- Ana Paula Belo (born 1987), Brazilian handball player
- Ana Beloica Martać, Serbian politician
- Ana Beltrán (born 1966), Spanish politician
- Ana Benderać (born 1977), Serbian chess player
- Ana Maria Berbece (born 1999), Romanian handball player
- Ana-Maria Berdilă (born 1993), Romanian volleyball player
- Ana Bereciartúa (1936–2023), Spanish social worker and politician
- Ana María Berlanga (1880–1935), Mexican pedagogue
- Ana Bernardo (politician) (born 1968), Portuguese politician and trade unionist
- Ana Bernardo (swimmer) (born 1976), Spanish swimmer
- Ana Bešlić (1912–2008), Serbian sculptor
- Ana Betancourt (1832–1901), Cuban revolutionary
- Ana Talía Betancur (born 1986), Colombian freestyle wrestler
- Ana Bettz (born 1958), Italian singer
- Ana Binet (born 1992), Dominican Republic volleyball player
- Ana Birchall (born 1973), Romanian politician
- Ana Bjelica (born 1992), Serbian volleyball player
- Ana Blanco (born 1961), Spanish journalist and news anchor
- Ana Blandiana (born 1942), Romanian writer
- Ana Cecilia Blum (born 1972), Ecuadorian writer and journalist
- Ana Boban (born 1947), Croatian swimmer
- Ana Bobanović (born 2009), Croatian swimmer
- Ana Bogdan (born 1992), Romanian tennis player
- Ana Cláudia Bolzan (born 1996), Brazilian handball player
- Ana María Boone Godoy (born 1964), Mexican politician
- Ana Borges (born 1990), Portuguese footballer
- Ana Paula Borgo (1993–2023), Brazilian volleyball player
- Ana Borovečki (born 1973), Croatian doctor and medical researcher
- Ana Botafogo (born 1957), Brazilian ballet dancer and actress
- Ana Botella (born 1953), Spanish politician
- Ana Cristina Botero (born 1968), Colombian actress
- Ana Botín (born 1960), Spanish businesswoman and banker
- Ana Isabel Boullón Agrelo (born 1962), Galician linguist
- Ana Boulter (born 1976), British television presenter
- Ana Božić (born 1988), Croatian basketball player
- Ana Maria Braga (born 1949), Brazilian presenter
- Ana Branger, pioneering Venezuelan aviator
- Ana Maria Brescia Cafferata, Peruvian billionaire heiress
- Ana Brian Nougreres, Uruguayan academic and lawyer
- Ana J. Bridges, assistant professor at the University of Arkansas
- Ana Briones Alonso, Spanish medical researcher
- Ana M. Briongos (1946–2024), Spanish author
- Ana Brnabić (born 1975), Serbian politician
- Ana Brun, Paraguayan actress and lawyer
- Ana Buceta (born 1992), Spanish footballer
- Ana Buchukuri (born 1990), Georgian politician
- Ana Bucik (born 1993), Slovenian World Cup alpine ski racer
- Ana Buenaventura Mocoroa (died 2001), Argentine physicist
- Ana Burgos (born 1967), Spanish triathlete
- Ana Bustorff (born 1959), Portuguese actress
- Ana Cabecinha (born 1984), Portuguese race walker
- Ana Gabriela Cabilhas (born 1997), Portuguese politician
- Ana Cabrera (born 1982), American journalist
- Ana Lilia Garza Cadena (born 1970), Mexican politician
- Ana Luiza Caetano (born 2002), Brazilian archer
- Ana Cairo Ballester (1949–2019), Cuban writer, researcher and professor
- Ana Caldas, Spanish actor
- Ana Ros Camacho, Spanish mathematician physicist
- Ana Caroline Campagnolo (born 1990), Brazilian politician
- Ana María Campos (1796–1828), Venezuelan fighter
- Ana Mercedes Campos (1930–2013), Salvadoran athlete
- Ana Paula Campos (born 1994), Brazilian volleyball player
- Ana María Campoy (1925–2006), Argentine actress
- Ana Cannas da Silva (born 1968), Portuguese mathematician
- Ana Cano (born 1950), Spanish philologist
- Ana Cecilia Cantú (born 1985), Mexican competitive figure skater
- Ana Capeta (born 1997), Portuguese footballer
- Ana Capri (born 1979), Philippine actress
- Ana Caraiani, Romanian-American mathematician
- Ana Caram (born 1958), Brazilian singer and musician
- Ana Čarapić, Serbian politician
- Ana Cardoso, several people
- Ana Cardus (born 1943), Mexican ballerina and ballet master
- Ana Julia Carepa (born 1957), Brazilian politician
- Ana Carla, several people
- Ana Carol (born 1990), Brazilian association football player
- Ana Carolina (born 1974), Brazilian singer
- Ana Carolina (director) (born 1943), Brazilian film director
- Ana Carpio, Spanish applied mathematician
- Ana Carrasco (born 1997), Spanish motorcycle racer
- Ana Carrascosa (born 1980), Spanish judoka
- Ana Cecilia Carrillo (born 1955), Peruvian volleyball player
- Ana Cartianu (1908–2001), Romanian academic, essayist and translator
- Ana Luisa Carvajal Gamoneda (born 1963), Cuban chess player
- Ana Maria Carvalho, Brazilian professor
- Ana Paula Chantre Luna de Carvalho, Angolan politician
- Ana Carvalho (born 1996), Portuguese Volt politician
- Ana Casares (1930–2007), Polish-Argentine film actress
- Ana Casas, several people
- Ana Cristina Cash (born 1985), Cuban-American singer-songwriter
- Ana Casís, Panamanian sociologist and statistician
- Ana María Castañeda (born 1984), Colombian politician
- Ana Castela (born 2003), Brazilian singer-songwriter
- Ana Castellain (born 1985), Brazilian powerlifter
- Ana Augusta de Castilho (1860–1916), Portuguese feminist
- Ana Castillo (born 1953), American writer
- Ana de Castro Egas, Spanish writer
- Ana de Castro Osório (1872–1935), Portuguese feminist
- Ana Cata-Chitiga (born 1989), Romanian-born French basketball player
- Ana María Catalá (born 1993), Spanish footballer
- Ana Catarina (born 1992), Portuguese futsal player
- Ana Cate (born 1991), American-born Nicaraguan footballer
- Ana Mari Cauce (born 1956), American psychologist and academic administrator
- Ana Celentano (born 1969), American actress
- Ana Thea Cenarosa (born 1992), Filipino netballer
- Ana Cepinska (born 1978), Venezuelan model
- Ana Cristina Cesar (1952–1983), Brazilian poet, literary critic and translator
- Ana Rosa Chacón (1889–1985), Costa Rican activist and educator
- Ana Beatriz Francisco das Chagas (born 1971), Brazilian volleyball player
- Ana Cheminava (born 1996), Georgian footballer
- Ana María Choquehuanca (born 1958), Peruvian politician
- Ana Christensen, American-born, Australian singer-songwriter
- Ana Chumachenco (born 1945), Italian violinist
- Ana Clavel (born 1961), Mexican writer
- Ana Cleger (born 1989), Cuban volleyball player
- Ana Cofiño, Guatemalan anthropologist and historian
- Ana Coimbra (born 2000), Angolan model and beauty pageant titleholder
- Ana Colchero (born 1968), Mexican actress
- Ana Collado Jiménez (born 1984), Spanish politician
- Ana Colomar O'Brien (born 1938), American diplomat
- Ana Colovic Lesoska, Macedonian environmental activist
- Ana Paula Connelly (born 1972), Brazilian volleyball player and journalist
- Ana Conta-Kernbach (1865–1921), Romanian teacher, writer and women's rights activist
- Ana Contreras (born 1984), Dominican Republic beauty pageant titleholder
- Ana Brenda Contreras (born 1986), Mexican actress
- Ana Copado (born 1980), Spanish water polo player
- Ana Laura Cordeiro, Brazilian jiu-jitsu practitioner
- Ana Belén Cordero, Ecuadorian politician
- Ana Livia Cordero (1931–1992), Puerto Rican doctor and political activist
- Ana Fabricia Córdoba (c.1959 – 2011), Colombian human rights activist
- Ana Corradi (born 1962), Argentine politician
- Ana Corrales, American technology executive
- Ana Correa (born 1985), Spanish volleyball player
- Ana Beatriz Corrêa (born 1992), Brazilian volleyball player
- Ana Cortés (1895–1998), Chilean painter
- Ana Coto (born 1990), American actress
- Ana Maria Covrig (born 1994), Romanian cyclist
- Ana Marie Cox (born 1972), American writer and editor
- Ana Crespo (born 1948), Spanish lichenologist
- Ana-Maria Crnogorčević (born 1990), Swiss footballer
- Ana Cruz, lobbyist
- Ana Cruz Kayne (born 1984), American actress
- Ana Bela Cruzeiro, Portuguese mathematician
- Ana María Cué (born 1941), Argentine pianist, poet and educator
- Ana Maria Cuervo (born 1966), Spanish scientist and biochemist
- Ana Cumpănaș (1889–1947), Romanian-American prostitute and madam
- Ana Marcela Cunha (born 1992), Brazilian swimmer
- Ana María Custodio (1908–1976), Spanish actress
- Ana García D'Atri (born 1967), Spanish editor, journalist and politician
- Ana Dabović (born 1989), Serbian basketball player
- Ana Dangalakova (born 1987), Bulgarian swimmer
- Ana Daniel (1928–2011), Portuguese poet
- Ana-Iulia Dascăl (born 2002), Romanian swimmer
- Ana Paula De Alencar (born 1992), Brazilian rhythmic gymnast
- Ana Debelić (born 1994), Croatian handball player
- Ana Delfosse (c. 1931–2017), Argentine race car driver and Formula One mechanic
- Ana Albertina Delgado Álvarez (born 1963), Cuban artist
- Ana María Dellai (1929–1986), Argentine alpine skier
- Ana Denicola (born 1959), Uruguayan scientist
- Ana Đerek (born 1998), Croatian artistic gymnast
- Ana Derșidan-Ene-Pascu (1944–2022), Romanian fencer
- Ana María Desevici (born 1955), Uruguayan pentathlete
- Ana Destéfano (born 1981), Argentine gymnast
- Ana Diamond (born 1996), British-Iranian political commentator and human rights activist
- Ana Dias, several people
- Ana Díaz, several people
- Ana Teresa Diego (1954–c. 1976), Argentine astronomy student
- Ana Díez (born 1957), Spanish director and screenwriter
- Ana Diosdado (1938–2015), Spanish-Argentine actress and playwright
- Ana Đokić (born 1979), Montenegrin handball player
- Ana Domingos, Portuguese neuroscientist
- Ana Lucía Domínguez (born 1983), Colombian actress
- Ana Drago, Portuguese sociologist and politician
- Ana Drev (born 1985), Slovenian alpine skier
- Ana Clara Duarte (born 1989), Brazilian tennis player
- Ana Duato (born 1968), Spanish actress
- Ana Dujmović (born 1996), Croatian footballer
- Ana Roque de Duprey (1853–1933), Puerto Rican activist
- Maria Berenice Hencker (1898–1993), Colombian religious sister
- Ana Estela Durán Rico (born 1955), Mexican politician
- Ana Lilia Durán (born 1997), Mexican weightlifter
- Ana Egge (born 1976), American singer-songwriter
- Ana María Eizaguirre (born 1963), Spanish basketball player
- Ana Belén Elgoyhen (born 1959), Argentine molecular biologist
- Ana Isabel Elias (born 1965), Angolan middle-distance runner
- Ana Vilma de Escobar (born 1954), Salvadoran politician
- Ana María Escribano (born 1981), Spanish footballer
- Ana A. Escrogima, American diplomat
- Ana Rita Esgário (born 1958), Brazilian politician
- Ana Esmeralda (1931–2022), Spanish actress
- Ana Bertha Espín (born 1958), Mexican actress
- Ana María Estalella (1933–2015), Spanish tennis player
- Ana Estrada (1976–2024), Peruvian euthanasia activist
- Ana Estrella Santos, Ecuadorian dialectologist and writer
- Ana María Estupiñán (born 1992), Colombian actress and singer
- Ana Ligia Fabian (born 1988), Dominican Republic volleyball player
- Ana Fabrega, American comedian
- Ana Faez (born 1972), Cuban fencer
- Ana Falú, Argentine architect and social activist
- Ana Fani Alessandri Carlos (born 1952), Brazilian geographer
- Ana Dulce Félix (born 1982), Portuguese long-distance runner
- Ana Ferariu (born 1997), Romanian basketball player
- Ana Rocha Fernandes, Cape Verdean director, screenwriter and film director
- Ana Fernández, several people
- Ana Ndala Fernando, Angolan politician
- Ana Figuero (1907–c. 1970), Chilean educator, feminist, activist and government official
- Ana Luiza Filiorianu (born 1999), Romanian rhythmic gymnast
- Ana Firmino, Cape Verdean singer
- Ana Fleitas (born 1992), Paraguayan footballer
- Ana María Flores (born 1952), Bolivian engineer, businesswoman and ex-senator
- Ana Carolina da Fonseca (born 1978), Brazilian-American actress, television personality and model
- Ana Catarina Fonseca, Portuguese neurologist
- Ana María Fontán (1928–2011), Argentine sprinter
- Ana Fortin (born 1972), Honduran swimmer
- Ana Luiza Franceschi (born 2008), Brazilian rhythmic gymnast
- Ana Francisco (born 1980), Portuguese swimmer
- Ana Franco (born 1999), Spanish footballer
- Ana Frango Elétrico (born 1997), Brazilian singer-songwriter
- Ana Free (born 1987), English-Portuguese singer
- Ana Frega, Uruguayan writer and historian
- Ana Frohmiller (1891–1971), American politician
- Ana Gabriel (born 1955), Mexican singer and songwriter
- Ana Galán (born 1964), Spanish writer
- Ana Galarza (born 1988), Ecuadorian model and politician
- Ana Galindo, several people
- Ana Gallay (born 1986), Argentine beach volleyball player
- Ana Gallum, American businesswoman
- Ana Galvis Hotz (1855–1934), Colombian gynecologist
- Ana Patricia Gámez (born 1987), Mexican host and beauty pageant titleholder
- Ana Garcés (born 2000), Spanish actress
- Ana García-Arcicollar (born 1982), Spanish Paralympic swimmer
- Ana García Armada, Spanish electrical engineer
- Ana García Bergua, Mexican writer
- Ana García Carías (born 1968), former First Lady of Honduras
- Ana García Lozano (born 1963), Spanish journalist
- Ana García-Siñeriz (born 1965), Spanish television presenter
- Ana Belen Garcia Antequera (born 1981), Spanish cyclist
- Ana Julia García (born 1961), Honduran politician
- Ana María García, American film director
- Ana María García (volleyball) (born 1957), Cuban volleyball player
- Ana Rosa García (born 1997), Dominican judoka
- Ana Lucía de la Garza Barroso, Mexican epidemiologist
- Ana Margarita Gasteazoro (1950–1993), Salvadoran activist and political prisoner
- Ana Gasteyer (born 1967), American stage, film and television actress
- Ana Gayán (born 2000), Spanish rhythmic gymnast
- Ana María Gayoso (1948–2004), Argentinian marine biologist
- Ana María Gazmuri (born 1966), Chilean actress and activist
- Ana Gervasi (1966–c. 2024), Peruvian diplomat
- Ana Girardot (born 1988), French stage, film and television actress
- Ana Maria Giulietti, Argentinian botanist
- Ana María Giunta (1943–2015), Argentine actress
- Ana María Godes (born 1968), Spanish table tennis player
- Ana Godinez (born 1999), Canadian freestyle wrestler
- Ana Mendes Godinho (born 1972), Portuguese minister of Labour, Solidarity and Social Security
- Ana Golja (born 1996), Canadian actress and singer
- Ana Gomes (born 1954), Portuguese diplomat and politician
- Ana Botella Gómez (born 1958), Spanish politician
- Ana Ilce Gómez Ortega (1944–2017), Nicaraguan port and journalist
- Ana Matilde Gómez (born 1962), Panamanian politician
- Ana Sofía Gómez (born 1995), Guatemalan artistic gymnast
- Ana Maria Gonçalves, Brazilian writer
- Ana Gonçalves (born 1993), Angolan basketball player
- Ana Goñi (born 1953), Venezuelan rally co-driver
- Ana de Gonta Colaço (1903–1954), Portuguese sculptor and feminist
- Ana González, several people
- Ana Grozdanović (born 1995), Serbian politician
- Ana Marta González (born 1969), Spanish professor and philosopher
- Ana Maria Gosling (born 1985), Brazilian volleyball player
- Ana Nisi Goyco (1951–2019), Puerto Rican politician and beauty pageant titleholder
- Ana Gradišnik (born 1996), Slovenian pool player
- Ana Grbac (born 1988), Croatian volleyball player
- Ana Simina Grigoriu (born 1981), Romanian-born Canadian-German electronic musician
- Ana María Groot (born 1952), Colombian historian, archaeologist and anthropologist
- Ana Gros (born 1991), Slovenian handball player
- Ana Maria Groza (born 1976), Romanian race walker
- Ana Gruzinskaya Golitsyna (1763–1842), Georgian princess
- Ana Guadalupe, Puerto Rican chemist and academic administrator
- Ana Guardia (born 1990), Panamanian footballer
- Ana Guerra (born 1994), Spanish singer
- Ana Clara Guerra Marques (born 1962), Angolan professional dancer
- Ana Maria Guerra Martins (born 1963), Portuguese jurist and judge
- Ana Guevara (born 1977), Mexican athlete and politician
- Ana Julia Guido (born 1959), Nicaraguan jurist
- Ana Lilia Guillén Quiroz (born 1955), Mexican politician
- Ana Guiomar (born 1988), Portuguese actress
- Ana Sol Gutierrez (born 1942), American politician
- Ana Guțu (born 1962), Moldovan politician
- Ana María Guzmán (born 2005), Colombian footballer
- Ana Recio Harvey, Mexican economist
- Ana Hatherly (1929–2015), Portuguese writer, artist, filmmaker and philologist
- Ana Hato (1907–1953), New Zealand singer
- Ana Lisa Hedstrom (born 1943), American fiber artist
- Ana Hernández (born 1962), Cuban basketball player
- Ana Hernandez (born 1978), Texas politician
- Ana María Hernández Salgar, UN biodiversity chair
- Ana María Hernando (born 1959), Argentine artist
- Ana Herrera, Ecuadorian politician
- Ana Herrera Isasi (born 1966), Spanish politician and journalist
- Ana Lilia Herrera Anzaldo (born 1971), Mexican politician
- Ana Hickmann (born 1981), Brazilian model and television host
- Ana Lucía Hill Mayoral (born 1971), Mexican academic and politician
- Ana Paula Höfling, American dancer and academic
- Ana Hormigo (born 1981), Portuguese judoka
- Ana María Hourrutinier, Cuban volleyball player
- Ana Mercedes Hoyos (1942–2014), Colombian painter and sculptor
- Ana Huanca (born 1986), Bolivian footballer
- Ana María Huarte (1786–1861), empress consort of Mexico
- Ana María Ianni (born 1969), Argentine politician
- Ana Iliuță (born 1958), Romanian rower
- Ana S. Iltis, American philosopher
- Ana Ipătescu (1805–1875), Romanian revolutionary
- Ana Isabelle (born 1986), Puerto Rican dancer
- Ana Istarú (born 1960), Costa Rican poet, actress and screenwriter
- Ana Maria Iuganu (born 1990), Romanian handball player
- Ana Ivanovic (born 1987), Serbian tennis player
- Ana María Izurieta (born 1993), Spanish artistic gymnast
- Ana Inés Jabares-Pita (born 1987), Spanish designer
- Ana Lau Jaiven, Mexican feminist, academic and research
- Ana Jakšić, Serbian-Russian noblewoman
- Ana Janer, first from Puerto Rico to earn a medical degree
- Ana Jara Martínez (born 1995), Spanish actress
- Ana Jara (born 1968), Peruvian lawyer and politician
- Ana Jelenčić (born 1994), Croatian footballer
- Ana Jelušić (born 1986), Croatian alpine skier
- Ana de Jesús (1545–1621), Spanish Discalced Carmelite nun and writer
- Ana Jiménez (born 1979), Cuban Paralympic athlete
- Ana Johnsson (born 1977), Swedish singer
- Ana Joković (born 1979), Serbian basketball player
- Ana Jotta, Portuguese artist
- Ana Jorge (born 1949), Portuguese pediatrician, politician and former Minister of Health
- Ana Jovanović (born 1984), Serbian tennis player
- Ana Juan (born 1961), Spanish artist, illustrator and painter
- Ana Luz Juárez Alejo, Mexican lawyer and politician
- Ana Julaton (born 1983), American boxer and mixed martial arts fighter
- Ana Junyer (born 1963), Spanish basketball player
- Ana Jurka (born 1985), Honduran journalist
- Ana Justel (born 1967), Spanish statistician and Antarctic scientist
- Ana Kačarević (born 1984), Serbian handball player
- Ana Kalandadze (1924–2008), Georgian poet
- Ana Kamien, Argentine choreographer
- Ana Mayer Kansky (1895–1962), Slovenian chemist and chemical engineer
- Ana Karadžić, Serbian politician
- Ana Karić (1941–2014), Croatian actress
- Ana Kasparian (born 1986), American political commentator and media host
- Ana Kaštelan (born 1980), Croatian volleyball player
- Ana Katz (born 1975), Argentine writer, director and actress
- Ana Khouri (born 1981), Brazilian jewelry designer and sculptor
- Ana Knežević (born 2002), Montenegrin footballer
- Ana Kobal (born 1983), Slovenian alpine skier
- Ana Kojić (born 1997), Serbian handball player
- Ana Kokić (born 1983), Serbian singer-songwriter
- Ana Kokkinos (born 1958), Australian filmmaker
- Ana Konjuh (born 1997), Croatian tennis player
- Ana Kordzaia-Samadashvili (born 1968), Georgian writer and literary journalist
- Ana Kraš (born 1984), American fashion designer
- Ana Kupresanin, Croatian-American statistician
- Ana Laan (born 1967), Spanish singer-songwriter
- Ana Laguna (born 1954), Spanish-Swedish ballet dancer
- Ana Emilia Lahitte (1921–2013), Argentine writer and poet
- Ana Laíns (born 1979), Portuguese fado singer
- Ana-Maurine Lara, Dominican American lesbian poet, novelist and black feminist scholar
- Ana Lara (born 1959), Mexican composer
- Ana Lasić, Slovenian screenwriter and playwright of Serbian descent
- Ana Laura (born 1986), American singer
- Ana Layevska (born 1982), Ukrainian-born Mexican actress and singer
- Ana Lazarević (born 1991), Serbian volleyball player
- Ana Roxana Lehaci (born 1990), Austrian canoeist
- Ana Leite (born 1991), Portuguese-German footballer
- Ana Lelas (born 1983), Croatian basketball player
- Ana Lemos, several people
- Ana Lenchantin, American cellist
- Ana Lucia de León (born 1991), Guatemalan badminton player
- Ana Bertha Lepe (1934–2013), Mexican actress and model
- Ana Yurixi Leyva Piñón (born 1973), Mexican politician
- Ana Siulolo Liku (born 1974), Tongan hurdler
- Ana Lilić (born 1993), Serbian footballer
- Ana Lima, several people
- Ana Paula Lisboa, Afro-Brazilian writer, journalist and presenter
- Ana Ljubinković, Serbian fashion designer
- Ana María Llona Málaga (born 1936), Peruvian poet
- Ana Luz Lobato (born 1970), Mexican politician
- Ana Locking (born 1970), Spanish fashion designer
- Ana López (Cuban sprinter) (born 1982), Cuban sprinter
- Ana Gabriela López (born 1994), Mexican weightlifter
- Ana Maria Lopez, several people
- Ana Paola López (born 1994), Mexican footballer
- Ana Lovrin (born 1953), Croatian politician
- Ana Lozada (born 1997), Mexican footballer
- Ana Lozano (born 1991), Spanish long-distance runner
- Ana Lorena Sánchez (born 1990), Mexican-American actress
- Ana Luís (born 1976), Portuguese politician
- Ana Lupaș, Romanian artist
- Ana Maria Machado (born 1941), Brazilian children's writer
- Ana Rita Machado (born 1991), Portuguese actress
- Ana Maria Maciel (born 1987), Brazilian rhythmic gymnast
- Ana Lilian de la Macorra (born 1957), Mexican actress
- Ana Carmen Macri (1916–2022), Argentine politician
- Ana Flávia Magalhães Pinto, Brazilian historian and academic
- Ana Maria Magalhães (born 1950), Brazilian film actress and director
- Ana Maria Magalhães (writer) (born 1946), Portuguese children and youth literature writer
- Ana Vitória Magalhães (born 2000), Brazilian cyclist
- Ana Paula Maia (born 1977), Brazilian writer
- Ana Majhenić (born 1981), Croatian actress
- Ana Malec (born 2000), Croatian handball player
- Ana Fagianni de Maldonado (born 1943), Guatemalan diplomat and First Lady
- Ana Malhoa (born 1979), Portuguese musical artist
- Ana Karina Manco (born 1967), Venezuelan actress
- Ana Manso (born 1966), Spanish gymnast
- Ana Marcial (born 1953), Puerto Rican swimmer
- Ana Marinković (1881–1973), Serbian painter and nurse
- Ana Marinovic (born 1980), basketball player
- Ana Mariscal (1923–1995), Spanish actress, director, screenwriter and producer
- Ana Maria Marković (born 1999), Croatian footballer
- Ana-Marija Markovina, Croatian classical pianist
- Ana Marija Marović (1815–1887), Italian painter
- Ana Martins Marques (born 1977), Brazilian poet
- Ana Martín (born 1945), Mexican actress, singer, and model
- Ana Martínez, several people
- Ana Martinho, Portuguese diplomat
- Ana Martins (born 1972), Angolan swimmer
- Ana Filipa Martins (born 1996), Portuguese artistic gymnast
- Ana Paula Martins (born 1965), Portuguese politician and pharmacist
- Ana Maruščec (born 1988), Croatian handball player
- Ana Marzoa (born 1949), Argentine-Spanish actress
- Ana Maslać Plenković (born 1979), Croatian jurist
- Ana Matnadze (born 1983), Georgian-Spanish chess player
- Ana Mato (born 1959), Spanish politician
- Ana Paula Matos (born 1977), Brazilian politician
- Ana Matronic (born 1974), US singer with the Scissor Sisters
- Ana María Matute (1925–2014), Spanish author
- Ana Măzăreanu (born 1993), Romanian handball player
- Ana Medina, Venezuelan ambassador to Poland
- Ana Paula Mello (born 1961), Brazilian volleyball player
- Ana Mena (born 1997), Spanish singer and actress
- Ana Catarina Mendes (born 1973), Portuguese politician
- Ana G. Méndez (1908–1997), Puerto Rican educator
- Ana María Mendieta, Peruvian lawyer and politician
- Ana Mendieta (1948–1985), Cuban-American artist
- Ana Mendoza, several people
- Ana Amelia Menéndez (born 1972), Spanish middle-distance runner
- Ana Menéndez (born 1970), American novelist
- Ana Mercado (born 1983), Mexican volleyball player
- Ana Mérida (c. 1922–1991), Mexican ballet dancer and choreographer
- Ana Merino (born 1971), Spanish poet and scholar
- Ana Mesquita (born 1979), Portuguese archaeologist and communist politician
- Ana Mestre (born 1981), Spanish politician
- Ana Cláudia Michels (born 1981), Brazilian model and physician
- Ana Maria Micu (born 1979), Romanian visual artist
- Ana Lucía Migliarini de León (born 1983), Uruguayan tennis player
- Ana de Miguel (born 1961), Spanish philosopher and feminist
- Ana Mijic, Serbian hydrologist
- Ana Milagros Parra (born 1997), Venezuelan political scientist
- Ana Milán (born 1973), Spanish actress
- Ana Milchevska (born 2003), Macedonian footballer
- Ana Milenković (born 1980), Serbian singer
- Ana Miljanić, Serbian politician and athlete
- Ana Millán Gasca, Spanish historian of science
- Ana Milović (born 2001), Slovenian footballer
- Ana Miralles (born 1959), Spanish comic books artist
- Ana Miranda (born 1951), Brazilian poet and novelist
- Ana María Miranda (born 1949), Chilean musician
- Ana Mocanu (born 1937), Romanian volleyball player
- Ana Moceyawa (born 1989), New Zealand wrestler and judoka
- Ana Cagi Moi, Fijian netball player
- Ana Monteiro (born 1993), Portuguese swimmer
- Ana Montero (born 1980), Olympic synchronized swimmer
- Ana Monterroso de Lavalleja (1791–1858), Uruguayan patriot
- Ana Montes (born 1957), American intelligence analyst and spy
- Ana María Montoya (born 1991), Colombian footballer
- Ana Luisa Montufar (born 1993), Guatemalan beauty pageant contestant
- Ana Teresa Morales (born 1959), Bolivian economist
- Ana Morales, Spanish flamenco dancer and choreographer
- Ana Caterina Morariu (born 1980), Romanian-born Italian actress
- Ana Moreira (born 1980), Portuguese actress
- Ana Morgade (born 1979), Spanish presenter, comedian and actress
- A. R. Morlan (1958–2016), American writer
- Ana Moser (born 1968), Brazilian volleyball player, 12th Brazilian Minister of Sports
- Ana Celia Mota, Argentine-American-Swiss condensed matter physicist
- Ana Moura (badminton) (born 1986), Portuguese badminton player
- Ana Moura (born 1979), Portuguese singer
- Ana Gloria Moya (1954–2013), Argentine novelist
- Ana Mulvoy-Ten (born 1992), British actress
- Ana Muniz (born 1984), Brazilian swimmer
- Ana Muñoz, Spanish actress
- Ana Mureșan, Romanian politician
- Ana Ofelia Murguía (1933–2023), Mexican actress
- Ana Bricia Muro González (born 1963), Mexican politician
- Ana Naimasi (born 1994), Fijian rugby union player
- Ana Maria Narti (born 1936), Swedish writer and politician
- Ana Sabine Naumann (born 1947), Argentine alpine skier
- Ana Navarro (born 1971), American political strategist and commentator
- Ana Nieto Churruca (born 1961), Spanish writer and economist
- Ana Nieto (born 1994), Mexican volleyball player
- Ana Nikolić (born 1978), Serbian pop-folk singer
- Ana Sofia Nóbrega (born 1990), Portuguese-Angolan swimmer
- Ana Nóbrega (born 1980), Brazilian singer songwriter
- Ana María Noé (1914–1970), Spanish actress
- Ana Nogueira (born 1985), American actress
- Ana Beatriz Nogueira (born 1967), Brazilian actress
- Ana Catarina Nogueira (born 1978), Portuguese professional padel player
- Ana Flávia Nogueira, Brazilian chemist
- Ana Noovao, New Zealand netball player
- Ana María Norbis (born 1947), Uruguayan swimmer
- Ana Novković (born 1965), Serbian politician
- Ana Rosa Núñez (1926–1999), Cuban-American poet and librarian
- Ana María O'Neill (1894–1981), Puerto Rican activist and writer
- Ana Obregón (born 1955), Spanish singer and dancer
- Ana Cristina Oliveira (born 1973), Portuguese model and actress
- Ana Paula Oliveira (born 1978), Brazilian football referee, model and television presenter
- Ana Oliveira, Uruguayan professor and politician
- Ana Ollo (born 1965), Navarrese politician
- Ana Oncina (born 1989), Spanish comic book illustrator
- Ana Oramas (born 1959), Spanish politician
- Ana Orbeliani (1765–1832), Georgian Queen Consort
- Ana Orillac (born 1970), Panamanian model
- Ana María Orozco (born 1973), Colombian actress
- Ana Ortiz (born 1971), American actress and singer
- Ana María Ortiz, Bolivian beauty queen and model
- Ana Elisa Osorio, Venezuelan politician
- Ana Osorio (born 1987), Salvadoran tennis player
- Ana Osterman (born 1940), Slovene politician
- Ana Pacatiuș (born 1939), Romanian folk singer
- Ana Paula Padrão (born 1965), Brazilian journalist and TV host
- Ana Padrão (born 1967), Portuguese film actress
- Ana Padurariu (born 2002), Canadian artistic gymnast
- Ana Paiva, computer scientist
- Ana Palacio (born 1948), Spanish politician
- Ana Belén Palomo (born 1977), Spanish swimmer
- Ana Pardo de Vera (born 1974), Spanish journalist
- Ana Elia Paredes Arciga (born 1964), Mexican politician
- Ana Pascu (1944–2022), Romanian fencer and sport leader
- Ana Passos (born 1967), Portuguese politician and biologist
- Ana Pastor, several people
- Ana Patrícia (born 1997), Brazilian beach volleyball player
- Ana Pauker (1893–1960), Romanian politician
- Ana Paula (born 1997), Brazilian association football player
- Ana Maria Pavăl (born 1983), Romanian freestyle wrestler
- Ana Rosa Payán, Mexican politician
- Ana Gaby Paz (born 1995), Mexican footballer
- Ana Miranda Paz (born 1971), Spanish politician
- Ana Pechen (born 1949), Argentine biochemist and politician
- Ana Miguel Pedro (born 1988), Portuguese jurist and politician
- Ana María Peiró, athlete
- Ana Peláez (born 1998), Spanish professional golfer
- Ana María Pelaz (born 1987), Spanish rhythmic gymnast
- Ana Pelegrín (c. 1938–2008), Argentine educator, writer and researcher
- Ana Peleteiro (born 1995), Spanish triple jumper
- Ana Luisa Peluffo (1929–2026), Mexican actress
- Ana Paula de la Peña (born 1988), Mexican tennis player
- Ana María Penas (born 1971), Spanish canoeist
- Ana Peraica (born 1972), Croatian new media scholar
- Ana de Peralta, Ecuadorian feminist
- Ana Teresa Pereira, Portuguese novelist
- Ana Pereira, Portuguese actress and singer
- Ana Pérez, several people
- Ana Perović (born 1977), Serbian basketball player
- Ana Pessoa Pinto (born 1956), East Timorese politician
- Ana María Picasso (born 1984), Peruvian journalist and TV host
- Ana María Picchio (born 1946), Argentine actress
- Ana Camila Pirelli (born 1989), Paraguayan heptathlete
- Ana Piterbarg, Argentine film director and screenwriter
- Ana Poghosian (born 1984), Georgian association footballer and rugby union player
- Ana Catalina Pohl (born 2005), German athlete
- Ana Paula Polegatch (born 1988), Brazilian cyclist
- Ana Polo (born 1990), Spanish journalist
- Ana María Polo (born 1958), Cuban-American lawyer and television arbitrator
- Ana Polvorosa (born 1987), Spanish actress
- Ana Pontón (born 1977), Spanish politician
- Ana Maria Popescu (born 1984), Romanian épée fencer
- Ana Popović (born 1976), Serbian blues guitarist and singer
- Ana Porgras (born 1993), Romanian artistic gymnast
- Ana Maria Porras (born 1991), American biomedical engineer
- Ana Elisa de la Portilla (born 1954), Mexican swimmer
- Ana Portnoy (1950–2020), Argentine photographer
- Ana Laura Portuondo Isasi (born 1996), Canadian judoka
- Ana Luz Porzecanski, Uruguayan conservation biologist
- Ana Poščić (born 1998), Croatian artistic gymnast
- ʻAna Poʻuhila (born 1979), Tongan athletics competitor
- Ana Prada (born 1971), Uruguayan politician
- Ana Maria Primavesi (1920–2020), Brazilian-Austrian agronomist
- Ana Yi Puig (born 1998), American actress
- Ana Liz Pulido, Mexican-American chef and restaurateur
- Ana de Quesada y Loynaz (1843–1910), Cuban revolutionary
- Ana Quezada (born 1965), American politician
- Ana Rosa Quintana (born 1956), Spanish journalist and television presenter
- Ana Quirós, Costa Rican feminist and activist
- Ana Mirjana Račanović-Jevtić, Bosnian singer, model and beauty pageant titleholder
- Ana Radović, several people
- Ana María Raffo, Ecuadorian politician
- Ana María Raga (born 1967), Venezuelan musician
- Ana María Ragonese (1928–1999), Argentine botanist
- Ana Rajčević, Serbian artist
- Ana Rajković (born 1996), Norwegian handball player
- Ana Ramacake (1937–2014), Fijian athlete and hotel owner
- Ana Ramírez, several people
- Ana Cláudia Ramos (born 1961), Brazilian volleyball player
- Ana-Maria Ramos (born 1976), American politician
- Ana Ravelo, paleoceanographer
- Ana Razdorov-Lyø (born 1973), Dutch-Serbian handball player
- Ana Sofia Reboleira, Portuguese biologist and speleologist
- Ana González de Recabarren (1925–2018), Chilean human rights activist
- Ana Redondo García (born 1966), Spanish politician
- Ana Reeves (born 1948), Chilean actress
- Ana Cristina Rego, Portuguese scientist
- Ana de la Reguera (born 1977), Mexican actress
- Ana Paula Renault (born 1981), Brazilian journalist and television personality
- Ana Rendón (born 1986), Colombian archer
- Ana Renovica, Serbian film producer
- Ana Rente (born 1988), Portuguese trampoline gymnast
- Ana Carolina Reston (1985–2006), Brazilian model
- Ana Revenco (born 1977), Moldovan politician
- Ana del Rey (born 1985), Spanish actress
- Ana Maria Rey (born c. 1976), Colombian physicist
- Ana C. Reyes (born 1974), American judge
- Ana Rezende (born 1983), Brazilian film director
- Ana Paula Ribeiro Tavares (born 1952), Angolan poet
- Ana Paula Ribeiro (born 1989), Brazilian rhythmic gymnast
- Ana Rich (born 1983), Serbian singer and media personality
- Ana Richa (born 1966), Brazilian volleyball player
- Ana Estefanía Dominga Riglos (1788–1870), Argentine patriot
- Ana Lucía Riojas Martínez, Mexican politician
- Ana María Sánchez de Ríos (born 1959), Peruvian diplomat
- Ana Rita (born 1976), Portuguese footballer
- Ana Rivas Logan (born 1961), American politician
- Ana Irma Rivera Lassén (born 1955), Afro-Puerto Rican attorney
- Ana Lilia Rivera (born 1973), Mexican politician
- Ana María Rivera (born 1993), Bolivian footballer and futsal player
- Ana Roca (born 1982), Croatian basketball player
- Ana Roces (born 1976), Filipino actress
- Ana Rocha Fernandes, Cape Verdean director, screenwriter and film editor
- Ana Rocha de Sousa (born 1978), French-Portuguese director, screenwriter and actress
- Ana María Rodas (born 1937), Guatemalan writer
- Ana Rodean (born 1984), Romanian racewalker
- Ana Rodrigues, several people
- Ana Rodríguez, several people
- Ana Paula Rojas (born 1997), Bolivian footballer
- Ana María Rojas Ruiz (born 1969), Mexican politician
- Ana Roje (1909–1991), Croatian ballet dancer
- Ana Patricia Rojo (born 1974), Mexican actress and singer
- Ana Roldán, Mexican-Swiss artist
- Ana Roman (born 1975), Romanian biathlete
- Ana Romero (born 1987), Spanish footballer
- Ana Romero Masiá (born 1952), Spanish historian and archaeologist
- Ana Romero Roguera (died 2020), Spanish rancher and businesswoman
- Ana Clara Romero (born 1979), Argentine politician
- Ana Crysna da Silva Romero (born 1988), Angolan swimmer
- Ana Mirian Romero, Honduran human rights activist
- Ana Maria Roqica (born 1988), Fijian rugby sevens player
- Ana Roš (born 1972), Slovenian cook
- Ana Rosa (born 1942), Brazilian actress
- Ana Rosario Contreras, Venezuelan nurse and activist
- Ana Rovita (born 1991), Indonesian badminton player
- Ana Roxanne (born 1987), American musician and singer
- Ana Rubio Zavala (born 1993), Spanish Paralympic swimmer
- Ana Rucner (born 1983), Croatian cellist
- Ana Rugeles (1914–2012), Venezuelan composer
- Ana Ruiz Mitxelena (1967–1993), Spanish footballer
- Ana Rujas (born 1989), Spanish model turned actress
- Ana Rute (born 1998), Portuguese footballer
- Ana Ligia Mixco Sol de Saca (born 1961), First Lady of El Salvador
- Ana Sacerdote (1925–2019), Italian-born Argentine abstract artist
- Ana Paula Sacramento Neto, Angolan politician
- Ana Sălăgean (born 1937), Romanian athlete
- Ana Salas Lozano (born 1972), Spanish professional tennis player
- Ana Salmič (1902–1969), Slovenian farmer, folk healer and poet, known as Anka Salmič
- Ana Sanabria (born 1990), Colombian cyclist
- Ana Sánchez-Colberg (born 1962), Puerto Rican dancer
- Ana Sánchez (born 1976), Spanish golfer
- Ana M. Sanchez, Spanish microscopist
- Ana Sofía Sánchez (born 1994), Mexican tennis player
- Ana Flávia Sanglard (born 1970), Brazilian volleyball player
- Ana Sansão, Mozambican politician
- Ana de Santana (born 1960), Angolan writer
- Ana Rita Santiago, Brazilian author and academic
- Ana Santos Aramburo, Spanish librarian
- Ana Santos (born 1967), Portuguese politician
- Ana Eduarda Santos, Portuguese writer
- Ana Filipa Santos (born 1996), Portuguese tennis player
- Ana Miguel dos Santos (born 1981), Portuguese politician
- Ana Paula dos Santos (born 1963), First Lady of Angola (1991–2017)
- Ana Elisa Santos Silva (born 2005), Brazilian politician
- Ana Šargić, Serbian model
- Ana Sasso, Croatian model
- Ana Sátila (born 1996), Brazilian canoeist
- Ana Raquel Satre (c. 1925–2014), musical artist
- Ana Savić (born 1989), Croatian tennis player
- Ana Maria Savu (born 1990), Romanian handball player
- Ana Paula Scheffer (1989–2020), Brazilian rhythmic gymnast
- Ana Rosa Schlieper de Martínez Guerrero (1898–1964), Argentine activist
- Ana Schmidt, German architect and painter
- Ana María Schultz (born 1935), Argentine swimmer
- Ana Segura (born 1969), Spanish tennis player
- Ana Segura (weightlifter) (born 1991), Colombian weightlifter
- Ana Seiça (born 2001), Portuguese footballer
- Ana Šekularac, British-Serbian fashion designer
- Ana María Sempértegui (born 1958), Bolivian politician
- Ana Semren (born 1988), Croatian basketball player
- Ana Seneviratne (1927–2015), Sri Lankan diplomat
- Ana Serradilla (born 1978), Mexican actress
- Ana Serrano Redonnet (1910s—1993), Argentine author and composer
- Ana Shalikashvili (1919–2004), Georgian painter
- Ana María Shua (born 1951), Argentine writer
- Ana Siafa, rugby player
- Ana Siljak (born 1969), Canadian historian and writer
- Ana Silva, several people
- Ana Silvera, British singer
- Ana Šimić (born 1990), Croatian high jumper
- Ana María Simo, American dramatist
- Ana Iris Simón (born 1991), Spanish writer
- Ana Simonović (born 1969), Serbian biologist and politician
- Ana Sofía Soberanes (born 1977), Mexican rower
- Ana Catalina Soberanis (born 1948), first female President of the Congress of Guatemala
- Ana Sofrenović (born 1972), Serbian actress
- Ana Soklič (born 1984), Slovenian singer
- Ana Sokolovic, Canadian composer
- Ana María Solórzano (born 1977), Peruvian lawyer and politician
- Ana Šomlo (1935–2024), Serbian-Israeli writer and journalist
- Ana de Sousa Baptista (born 1971), Portuguese poet and writer
- Ana de Sousa (born 1969), Portuguese archer
- Ana Lúcia Souza (born 1982), Brazilian American journalist, ballerina and filmmaker
- Ana Cristina de Souza (born 2004), Brazilian volleyball player
- Ana K. Spalding, Afro-Panamanian marine biologist
- Ana Lucía Spross (born 1982), Guatemalan footballer
- Ana Srebrnič (born 1984), Slovene chess player
- Ana Sršen (born 1973), Croatian swimmer
- Ana Štajdohar (born 1986), Serbian singer
- Ana Maria Stanciu (born 1987), Romanian footballer
- Ana Stanić (born 1975), Serbian singer
- Ana Starck-Stănișel (1935–2024), Romanian handball player
- Ana Starovoitova (born 1993), Lithuanian boxer
- Ana Štěrba-Böhm (1885–1936), Slovene chemist
- Ana Stevanović, Serbian politician
- Ana Stjelja, Serbian writer and translator
- Ana Subotić (born 1983), Serbian long-distance runner
- Ana María Surra (born 1952), Spanish politician
- Ana Tadić (born 1998), French-Serbian basketball player
- Ana Lucrecia Taglioretti (1995–2020), Paraguayan violinist
- Ana Claudia Talancón (born 1980), Mexican actress
- Ana Maria Tănasie (born 1995), Romanian handball player
- Ana Tarrés (born 1967), Spanish synchronized swimmer and politician
- Ana Tasić (born 1978), Serbian theatre critic and researcher
- Ana Paula de Tassis (born 1965), Italian volleyball player
- ʻAna Taufeʻulungaki (1946–2024), Tongan academic and politician
- Ana Maria Tavares, Brazilian artist
- Ana Tejada (born 2002), Spanish footballer
- Ana Temprano (born 1984), Spanish handball player
- Ana Tepavac (born 1995), Serbian taekwondo practitioner
- Ana Enriqueta Terán (1918–2017), Venezuelan poet
- Ana de Teresa (born 2001), Spanish footballer
- Ana Mirela Țermure (born 1975), Romanian javelin thrower
- Ana Maria Țicu (born 1992), Romanian handball player
- Ana Tijoux (born 1977) Chilean musician
- Ana José Tima (born 1989), Dominican Republic triple jumper
- Ana Timotić (born 1982), Serbian tennis player
- Ana Tiscornia (born 1951), Uruguayan artist
- Ana Titlić (born 1952), Croatian handball player
- Ana Toma (1912–1991), Romanian politician
- Ana Torfs, Belgian visual artist
- Ana Rosa Tornero (1907–1984), Bolivian writer and feminist
- Ana Torrent (born 1966), Spanish film actress
- Ana María Torres (born 1980), Mexican boxer
- Ana Teresa Torres (born 1945), Venezuelan writer
- Ana Torroja (born 1959), Spanish singer of pop trio Mocano
- Ana María Tostado (born 1971), Spanish volleyball player
- Ana-Maria Trăsnea (born 1994), Romanian-born German politician
- Ana Tristany (born 1966), Portuguese artist
- Ana Tsitlidze (born 1986), Georgian politician
- Ana Turk (born 1989), Croatian handball player
- Ana Tzarev, Croatian New Zealand artist and businesswoman
- Ana Ugalde (born 1925), Mexican painter
- Ana Ugrinovska (born 1980), Macedonian slalom canoeist
- Ana Ularu (born 1985), Romanian actress and model
- Ana Urbano (born 1964), Argentine rower
- Ana Uribe, Colombian muralist and painter
- Ana María Uribe, electronic literature writer
- Ana Urkijo (born 1954), Spanish lawyer
- Ana Gertrudis de Urrutia Garchitorena (1812–1850), Spanish painter
- Ana Usabiaga (born 1990), Spanish cyclist
- Ana Paula Valadão (born 1976), Brazilian contemporary Christian singer
- Ana Luisa Valdés (born 1953), Uruguayan writer and social anthropologist
- Ana Valle (born 1996), Mexican volleyball player
- Ana Valverde (1798–1864), Dominican activist and militant
- Ana Varela (born 1983), Spanish canoeist
- Ana Vasconcelos Martins (born 1985), Portuguese politician
- Ana Vasconcelos (born 1981), Brazilian water polo player
- Ana María Vázquez Hoys (born 1945), Spanish historian
- Ana Paula Vázquez (born 2000), Mexican archer
- Ana Veciana-Suarez (born 1956), Cuban columnist
- Ana Lydia Vega, Puerto Rican writer
- Ana Teresa Velázquez Beeck (born 1982), Mexican politician
- Ana Paula Vergutz (born 1989), Brazilian canoeist
- Ana Veselinova (born 1995), Macedonian footballer
- Ana Veselinović (born 1988), Montenegrin tennis player
- Ana Veydó, Colombian singer
- Ana Vicente (1943–2015), Anglo-Portuguese author and feminist
- Ana Victoria (born 1983), Mexican-American singer-songwriter
- Ana Vidal, Spanish-American poet and journalist
- Ana Vidigal (born 1960), Portuguese artist
- Ana Vidjen (born 1931), Croatian sculptor
- Ana Vidović (born 1980), Croatian guitarist
- Ana Viegas (born 1990), Portuguese footballer
- Ana Vieira (c. 1940–2016), Portuguese artist
- Ana Carolina Vieira, several people
- Ana María Vignoli (born 1945), Uruguayan former minister of Social Development
- Ana Margarita Vijil, Nicaraguan lawyer and activist
- Ana Vilela (born 1998), Brazilian singer-songwriter
- Ana Villafañe (born 1989), American actress
- Ana Villamil Icaza (1852–1916), Ecuadorian composer
- Ana Elisa Villanueva (1930–1998), First Lady of the Dominican Republic
- Ana Villanueva (born 1982), Dominican karateka
- Ana Vitória (born 2000), Brazilian footballer
- Ana Paula Vitorino, Portuguese politician
- Ana Maria Vlădulescu (born 2001), Romanian footballer
- Ana Voog (born 1966), American musician and Internet personality
- Ana Vrcelj (born 1993), Serbian beauty queen
- Ana Vrljić (born 1984), Croatian tennis player
- Ana Wagener, Spanish actress
- Ana Walshe (died 2023), Serbian-American murder victim
- Ana Whiterose (born 2001), musical artist
- Ana Wolfermann (born 2001), American actress
- Ana María Yabar Sterling (born 1948), Spanish politician, author and academic
- Ana-Maria Yanakieva (born 1998), Bulgarian singer
- Ana María Ycaza (born 1951), Ecuadorian tennis player
- Ana Paula Zacarias (born 1959), Portuguese diplomat
- Ana Zanatti (born 1949), Portuguese actress and writer
- Ana Zaninović (born 1987), Croatian taekwondo practitioner
- Ana María Zeno (1922–2011), Argentinian psychologist
- Ana Celia Zentella (born 1940), American linguist
- Ana Živojinović (born 1991), Serbian volleyball player
- Ana Zubashvili (born 1993), Georgian beauty queen

== Surname ==
- Nazo Anā, (1651–1717) Afghan poet
- Zarghona Anaa, (d. 1772) mother of Afghanistan's founder Ahmad Shah Durrani

== Fictional characters ==
- Ana, Kat's twin sister and a character in Nintendo's WarioWare series
- Ana Amari, a character in the video game Overwatch

== See also ==
- Ana (disambiguation)
- Anna (given name)
- Ant (name)
