= Ana Lilia =

Ana Lilia, sometimes univerbated as Analilia, is a Spanish female given name, a compound of Ana and Lilia. Notable people with the name include:

- Ana Lilia Durán (born 1997), Mexican weightlifter
- Ana Lilia Garza Cadena (born 1970), Mexican politician
- Ana Lilia Guillén Quiroz (born 1955), Mexican politician
- Ana Lilia Herrera Anzaldo (born 1971), Mexican politician
- Analilia Mejia (born 1977), American activist and politician
- Ana Lilia Rivera (born 1973), Mexican politician
