= Ana Sansão =

Mozambican politician

Member of the People's Assembly
- In office 1977–
- Constituency: Maputo Province

Ana Sansão Timana is a Mozambican politician and trade unionist. In 1977 she was one of the first group of women elected to the People's Assembly.

== Biography ==
Sansão was a FRELIMO candidate in the 1977 parliamentary elections, in which she was one of the first group of 27 women elected to the People's Assembly. She was re-elected to the Assembly in 1986 from Maputo Province as a representative of Riopele. She later served as the executive secretary of the Maputo City and Province branch of the Mozambique Workers' Organization.
