= Ana Pelegrín =

Argentine educator, writer and researcher

Ana María Pelegrín Sandoval (San Salvador de Jujuy, Argentina, 1938 - Madrid, Spain 11 September 2008) was an Argentine researcher, writer, and educator. She was considered one of the leading specialists on Hispanic literature and oral tradition of poetry.

== Selected works ==
- La aventura de oír (2012)
- Huerto de limonar (2007)
- Poesía española para jóvenes (2005)
- Letras para amar poemas (2004)
- Poesía española para niños (2002)
- Raíz de amor (1999)
- Misino Gatino (1997)
- Deditos y cosquillitas (1994)
