= Ana Dias =

Ana Dias may refer to:

- Ana Dias (runner) (born 1974), Portuguese marathon runner
- Ana Dias Lourenço (born 1957), Angolan politician
- Ana Dias (photographer) (born 1984), Portuguese photographer
- Ana Dias (footballer) (born 1997), Portuguese footballer

== See also ==
- Dias (surname)
