= Ana Stevanović =

Serbian politician

Ana Stevanović Đukić
- Ана Стевановић Ђукић

Member of the National Assembly of Serbia
- In office 2016–2024

Personal details
- Born: 1984 (age 41–42) Serbia, Yugoslavia
- Party: It's Enough – Restart (2016–2018); Independent (2018–2019); Party of Freedom and Justice (2019–2024)
- Other political affiliations: Independent MPs Club (2019)
- Education: University of Belgrade (Ph.D.)
- Occupation: Politician, cultural promoter
- Known for: Former Member of the National Assembly of Serbia
- Committees: Human and Minority Rights and Gender Equality; Culture and Information; Rights of the Child; Deputy member of various committees

Ana Stevanović Đukić (Serbian Cyrillic: Ана Стевановић Ђукић; born 1984) is a former politician in Serbia. She has served in the National Assembly of Serbia since 2016, initially as a member of the It's Enough – Restart (Dosta je bilo, DJB) association, better known in English by the name "Enough Is Enough," and since November 2018 as an independent.

== Private career ==
Stevanović has been a promoter of cultural events since 2004, working principally in communications strategies and public relations for Serbia's film festivals. She graduated from the University of Belgrade's Faculty of Dramatic Arts in 2008 and subsequently received a Ph.D. from the same department, with a focus on the psychology of creativity, the psychology of management and leadership, and the organizational innovations of cultural institutions. She has published in her field and has also written on media censorship. She lives in Belgrade.

== Political career ==
Stevanović received the seventh position on the DJB's electoral list in the 2016 Serbian parliamentary election and was elected when the association won sixteen mandates. The election was won by the Serbian Progressive Party and its allies, and the DJB served in opposition. Stevanović was for a time the deputy leader of the association's parliamentary group.

Stevanović served on the assembly's committee on human and minority rights and gender equality, the culture and information committee, and the committee on the rights of the child, and was a deputy member of the committee constitutional and legislative issues; the defence and internal affairs committee; the committee on labour, social issues, social inclusion, and poverty reduction; the health and family committee; the European integration committee; and the committee on administrative, budgetary, mandate, and immunity issues; as well as serving as a member of Serbia's parliamentary friendship groups with Austria, Azerbaijan, Brazil, Cyprus, Egypt, France, Greece, Israel, Italy, the Netherlands, Qatar, Romania, Sweden, Turkey, the United Arab Emirates, the United Kingdom, and the United States. She is also a substitute member of Serbia's delegation to the Parliamentary Assembly of the Council of Europe (PACE), where she is an alternate on the committee on migration, refugees, and displaced persons. She is not a member of any political grouping within the PACE.

She resigned from DJB's parliamentary group in November 2018 and initially intended to serve in a new group with four other former DJB members. Three members of this group resigned from the assembly shortly thereafter, however, leaving Stevanović and her one remaining colleague (Branislav Mihajlović) below the threshold for official recognition. On 25 March 2019, she and Mihajlović joined the Independent MPs Club parliamentary group. On 19 April of that same year, she was elected to the presidency of the newly formed Party of Freedom and Justice. In April 2024, due to disagreement over the announcement of election boycott, Stevanović Đukić decides to leave the Freedom and Justice Party. She resigns from all party positions - international secretary and member of the party presidency, maintaining the stance that boycotting the announced elections is wrong. With this act, she officially withdrew from the political life of Serbia.
