= Ana María Arévalo Gosen =

Venezuelan photographer

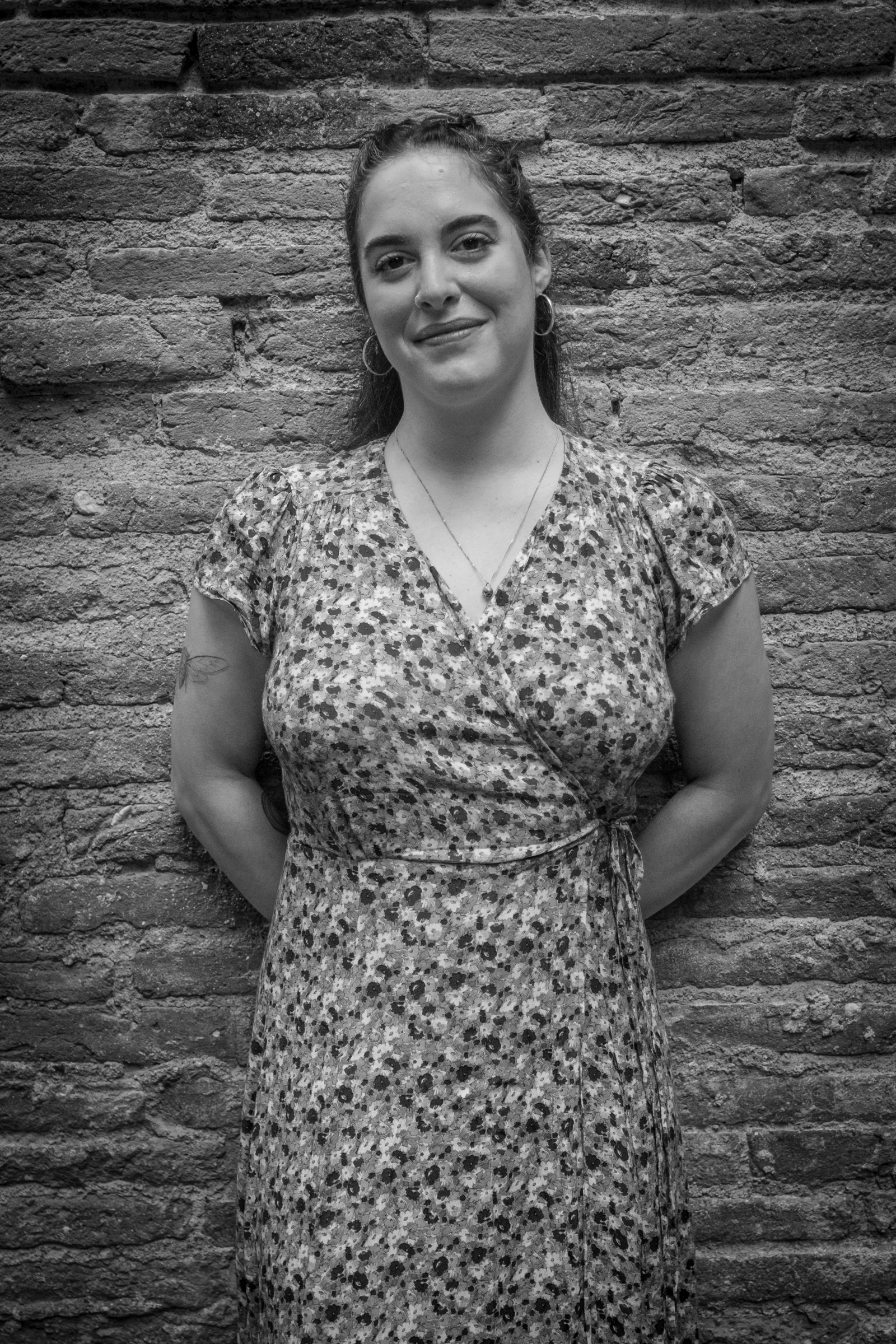
- Born: November 1, 1988 (age 36); Caracas, Venezuela
- Education: ETPA
- Occupation: Photographer
- Notable work: Dias Eternos
- Title: Visual storyteller
- Spouse: Philipp Quante
- Website: anamariaarevalogosen.com

Ana María Arévalo Gosen (born 1988) is a photographer.

== Early life and education ==
Arévalo Gosen was born in Caracas, Venezuela. As a result of violence, she left Venezuela in 2009 and moved to Toulouse, France where she pursued photography when she was 20 years old.

She studied photography as well as political science and graduated in 2014. She graduated from ETPA which is a French Photography school.

== Notable art ==
Arévalo Gosen believes the power of photography can raise awareness as well as a change toward social justice. She is an advocate for women's rights and a feminist.

She primarily works in Spain and Venezuela. In 2013, she moved to Hamburg, Germany and began working on project titled Hamburg Calles.

In 2017, after she encounters an old acquaintance at a wedding who introduces her to a journalist, she begins her project titled, Dias Eternos. This project focuses on detained women awaiting trial surviving overcrowded detention centers with substandard living conditions. Many of these innocent women awaiting trial are detained months and even years.

Arévalo Gosen has earned many awards including the Women Photograph+Nikon scholarship in 2018; Lucas Dolega prize in 2020; the Lumix photo award in 2020; the Camille Lepage prize in 2021; and the Leica Oskar Barnack prize in 2021.

Arévalo Gosen's most notable projects include Hamburg Calles (2015); The Meaning of Life (2016–2017); Dias Eternos (2017); and Women Water Defenders (2021).
