= Ana Casís =

Panamanian sociologist, statistician

Ana G. Casís was a Panamanian sociologist, statistician, and demographer who directed the 1950 Panamanian census, and later worked for the Inter-American Statistical Institute in Washington, DC. She is also known for her work with Kingsley Davis on urbanization in Latin America, Davis's first work on urbanization.

Casís earned a bachelor's degree in Panama in 1943, and a master's degree at Syracuse University in 1945, with the master's thesis "Population studies in Mexico, Panama, and Puerto Rico, with special reference to urbanization processes.

In 1979, she was named a Fellow of the American Statistical Association.

She died before 2012, when she was listed as a deceased former member by the Washington Statistical Society.
