= Ana Galvis Hotz =

Colombian gynaecologist

- Born: 22 June 1855; Bogotá, D.C., Republic of New Granada
- Died: 2 November 1934 (aged 79); Bogotá, D.C., Colombia
- Education: University of Bern (MD, 1877)
- Occupation: Gynaecologist
- Known for: First Colombian female physician
- Parent(s): Nicanor Galvis; Sophia Hotz

Ana Galvis Hotz (22 June 1855 — 2 November 1934) was the first Colombian woman to have obtained a medical degree as a Doctor of Medicine.

Ana was born on 22 June 1855 in Bogotá to Dr. Nicanor Galvis from Colombia, and his wife Sophie Hotz from Switzerland. In April 1872 she enrolled at the Faculty of Medicine at the University of Bern, becoming the first regular full-time student of the university, where she obtained her degree as a Doctor of Medicine on 26 June 1877 with her dissertation titled Über Amnionepithel (On the Amniotic Epithelial); she thus became not only the first Colombian female medical doctor, but also the first from Latin America or Spain, at a time when women could not even attend university in Colombia. On her return to Colombia she opened her own medical practice advertising her services as a "specialist on the diseases of the uterus and its surroundings"; therefore she is now also recognized as the first Colombian gynaecologist.
