= Ana Paula Araújo =

Ana Paula Araújo may refer to:

- Ana Paula Araújo (model) (born 1981), Brazilian model
- Ana Paula Araújo (newscaster) (born 1972), Brazilian newscaster and journalist
