= Ana Carolina Vieira =

Ana Carolina Vieira may refer to:

- Ana Carolina Vieira (swimmer) (born 2001), Brazilian Olympics swimmer
- Ana Carolina Vieira (fighter), Brazilian jiu-jitsu World champion
