= Ana Siafa =

- Height: 1.59 m (5 ft 3 in)
- Weight: 115 kg (254 lb)

Rugby union career
- Position: Prop
International career
Years	Team	Apps	(Points)
1989	New Zealand	1	(0)

Ana Siafa (née Nemaia) is a former New Zealand rugby union player. She played Prop for New Zealand and Ponsonby. She started in the Black Ferns historic match against the California Grizzlies at Christchurch in 1989.
