= Ana Carla =

Ana Carla may refer to:

- Ana Carla Carrizo (born 1966), Argentine political scientist
- Ana Carla Carvalho (born 1991), Brazilian swimmer
- Ana Carla (footballer) (born 1994), Brazilian footballer
