= Ana Ndala Fernando =

Angolan politician

Ana Paula Inês Luís Ndala Fernando is an Angolan politician for the MPLA and a member of the National Assembly of Angola.
