= Ana Bricia Muro González =

Mexican politician

- Born: 13 September 1963 (age 62); Durango, Durango, Mexico
- Occupations: Psychologist and politician
- Political party: PRI

Ana Bricia Muro González (born 13 September 1963) is a Mexican psychologist and politician affiliated with the Institutional Revolutionary Party. As of 2014 she served as Senator of the LIX Legislature of the Mexican Congress representing Durango as replacement of Ismael Alfredo Hernandez Deras.
