= Ana Barati =

Iranian wrestler

Personal information
- Native name: آنا براتی
- Full name: Ana Barati
- Nationality: Iranian
- Born: 11 April 1984 (age 42) Khorasan Razavi, Mashhad, Iran
- Height: 1.70 m (5 ft 7 in)
- Weight: 75 kg (165 lb)

Sport
- Country: Iran
- Sport: wrestling
Medal record
Event	1st	2nd	3rd
Asian Championships	-	–	1
Representing Iran
women's freestyle wrestling

Ana Barati (Persian: آنا براتی born 11 April 1984) is the head coach of Iran's national women's wrestling team. She is an IB Physical Education teacher in Azerbaijan.

== Achievements ==
Head coach of the national team

- Asian Championships – Freestyle wrestling (gold) Kyrgyzstan 2022
- Asian Championships – Alish wrestling (gold) Kyrgyzstan 2022
- Erkinbaev Cup Tournament - wrestling (gold) Kyrgyzstan 2021

=== Coaching ===
- World Championships – Alish wrestling (silver) Kyrgyzstan 2016
- World Championships – wrestling (gold) Iran 2015
- Belarus Cup Tournament - wrestling (gold) Belarus 2015

=== Wrestling career ===
- Iran Championships – wrestling (bronze) Iran 2014
- the Martyrs commanders of Azerbaijan Championships - judo (gold) 2011
- Fajr Open of Iran Championships - judo (gold) 2014
