= Ana Mijic =

Hydrologist

- Education: University of Belgrade
- Employer: Imperial College London
- Known for: Systems Water Management Urban Hydrology

Ana Mijic is a professor in the Department of Civil Engineering at Imperial College London who works in systems water management. She has expertise in advanced modelling of integrated water systems, as well as the analysis of processes, planning, resilience and economics.

== Education ==
Mijic completed an MEng degree in civil engineering at the University of Belgrade, Serbia. She moved to Imperial College London and earned a master's degree in hydrology for environmental management, in 2009 with distinction. She received her PhD from Imperial College London in 2013, for "Near-well effects in carbon dioxide storage in saline aquifers". Mijic was described by the Royal Meteorological Society as an "influential voice" in 2017.

== Research ==
After completing her PhD, Mijic remained at Imperial working on the Joint UK Land Environment Simulator (JULES). Since, she has been involved with a number of large scale international hydrological studies and surveys. In 2014 she was co-investigator on a NERC British Geological Survey funded project "Assessing the risk of groundwater-induced sewer flooding to inform water and sewerage company investment planning" alongside Chris Jackson. That year she led "Improved techno-economic evaluation of Blue Green Solutions for managing flood risk to infrastructure", also funded by NERC. She was co-investigator on FLIRE, an integrated decision support system for risk assessment of flash floods and forest fires. Mijic works with Imperial College London's Grantham Institute for Climate Change on Blue Green Dream, a systems approach to sustainable, cost-efficient urban development. She also works on "Hydroflux India", which monitors changes in water storage and fluxes in Northern India. She has also investigated pluvial floods in mediterranean cities.

Mijic is an affiliate of the Grantham Institute for Climate Change. In 2017, Mijic was promoted to senior lecturer at Imperial College London. Her research themes focus on:

- Data collection and simulations of inclusive water management zones
- Refining developed methods to improve planning and decision making of integrated water management
- Providing inputs for land surface-atmosphere coupling and urban micro-climate simulations

Mijic has three children and has spoken about how the support of Imperial College London allowed her to balance a scientific career and being a mother.

== Awards ==
- 2015 – Business Green Technology Award 2015 for the Blue Green Dream R&D Programme of the Year
- 2011 – ORSAS (Overseas Research Students Awards Scheme) Award, The Department of Earth Science and Engineering, Imperial College London
- 2010 – John Archer Scholarship Award, The Department of Earth Science and Engineering, Imperial College London
- 2009 – Victor Appleby Prize in Engineering Hydrology, Imperial College London
- 2009 – The Letitia Chitty Centenary Memorial Prize, Imperial College London
