= Ana Mocanu =

Romanian volleyball player

Personal information
- Nationality: Romanian
- Born: 16 March 1937 (age 88)

Sport
- Sport: Volleyball

Ana Mocanu (born 16 March 1937) is a Romanian volleyball player. She competed in the women's tournament at the 1964 Summer Olympics.
