= Ana Simonović =

Serbian biologist and politician

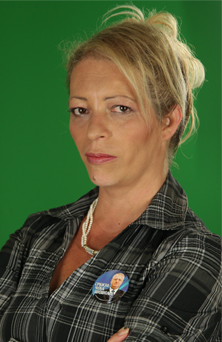
Ana Simonović

Ana Simonović (Serbian: Ана Симоновић) (born 26 December 1969) is a Serbian politician and biologist. She currently holds the position of Secretary General of the Serbian Radical Party.

== Biography ==
Ana D. Simonović (b. Latković) was born 26 December 1969 in Belgrade. She finished primary and secondary school in Belgrade, and went on to study Molecular Biology in the Faculty of Science, University of Belgrade, in 1989/90. She graduated in 1995 with an average of 9.4 / 10 and the diploma thesis "Influence of electron acceptors and gibberellic acid on germination of Empress tree (Paulowna tomentosa)".

A. Simonović got her master's degree in 1998 at the Department of Physiology of plants with an average of 10/10 and a thesis called "Interaction of gibberellic acid and Fusicoccin in stimulating germination of lettuce Lactuca sativa L."

At the end of 2000, she enrolled in doctoral studies at the State University of North Dakota, in the Cellular and Molecular Biology program. She won a prize of US presidential doctoral fellowships. She received her Ph.D. in 2006 with an average of 3.93 / 4 and a dissertation on "The effect of low temperature and light on glutamine synthetase isoforms in maize seedlings."

Since 1995, Simonović was employed as a researcher at the Department of Plant Physiology Institute for Biological Research "Sinisa Stankovic" (IBISS). The research associate was elected in 2000.

In May 2008, she was appointed Research Associate IBISS's. She is a contributor to the basic and technological project of the Ministry of Education and Science of the Republic of Serbia, as well as the international FP7 project "Terpmed". It deals with physiology, plant biotechnology, and bioinformatics. She has published dozens of scientific papers in international and national journals, as well as the book Biotechnology and genetic engineering of plants. From 2008 to 2011 she was working as head of the Department of Plant Physiology IBISS's.
