= Ana Majhenić =

Croatian actress

- Born: 16 June 1981 (age 45); Zagreb, SR Croatia, SFR Yugoslavia
- Education: Academy of Dramatic Art, University of Zagreb
- Occupation: Actress
- Years active: 1998–present

Ana Majhenić (born 16 June 1981) is a Croatian film and stage actress.

== Filmography ==
=== Film ===
Year	Film	Original title	Role	Notes
1998	The Canyon of Dangerous Games	Kanjon opasnih igara	Ketty Keller	
2010	Some Other Stories	Neke druge priče	Guest at a party	Omnibus film
2011	Rom Com	Rom kom	Ona	Short film
2011	7 seX 7	7 seX 7	Actress	
2015	Life Is Fair	Horvatovi	Wife	Short film

=== Television ===
Year	Original title	Role	Notes
2006–07	Obični ljudi	Matija Kincl	Main role
2007	Ne daj se, Nina!	Ivanka	2 episodes
2008	Zakon ljubavi	Olga Bakić (young)	2 episodes
2012	Stipe u gostima	Secretary	1 episode
2015	Glas naroda	TV host	1 episode
2015	Crno-bijeli svijet	Teacher	1 episode
2015	Kud puklo da puklo	Dragica	2 episodes
