= Ana Rodrigues =

Ana Rodrigues may refer to:

- Ana Rodrigues (swimmer), Portuguese swimmer
- Ana Rodrigues (settler), Brazilian settler
- Ana Paula Rodrigues (born 1988), Brazilian gymnast
- Anna Rodrigues, Brazilian jiu-jitsu practitioner
