= Ana Lucía de la Garza Barroso =

Mexican epidemiologist

- Known for: Director of Operational Epidemiological Research at the Health Secretariat in Mexico
- Scientific career
- Fields: Public health; Epidemiology
- Thesis: Contribución de la minería de contenidos Web de medios sociales a la inteligencia epidemiológica de Chikungunya y Zika 2016

Ana Lucía de la Garza Barroso was the director of Epidemiological Operations Research at Mexico's Ministry of Health, a doctor in public health who has helped to modernize epidemiological intelligence, and during the COVID-19 pandemic has contributed to the coordination of the International Health component of the COVID-19 response operation in Mexico, providing daily reports on its progress.

== Career ==
Ana Lucía de la Garza Barroso studied medicine at Justo Sierra University and received her postgraduate degree in epidemiology at the National Autonomous University of Mexico. She received a Master's in Public Health with a specialization in Health Administration at the National Institute of Public Health in Mexico with her thesis titled "Diseño e Implementación de los Procedimientos de Operación Estandarizados En la Unidad de Inteligencia Epidemiológica y Sanitaria de la Dirección General de Epidemiología". She received a PhD in Public Health from the Escuela de Salud Pública de México-Instituto Nacional de Salud Pública with the thesis titled "Contribución de la minería de contenidos Web de medios sociales a la inteligencia epidemiológica de Chikungunya y Zika 2016". She then enrolled in a doctorate program in Administrative Science from the Instituto Universitario Veracruzano.

=== Public Service ===
Before becoming the Director of Operational Epidemiological Research at Mexico's Ministry of Health, De la Garza Barroso worked as a research collaborator in International Health Regulations at the General Directorate of Epidemiology in Mexico from 2009 to 2019, and helped to modernize epidemiological intelligence.

Since April 2019, she has been the Director of Operational Epidemiological Research at the Health Secretariat in Mexico.

In 2020, along with Hugo López-Gatell Ramírez, she was appointed part of the medical response team dealing with the COVID-19 pandemic in Mexico. She has contributed to the coordination of the International Health component of the COVID-19 response operation in Mexico, providing daily reports on its progress.

== Selected publications ==
- Jimenez Corona, Maria Eugenia; de la Garza Barroso, Ana Lucía; Rodriguez Martínez, Jose Cruz; Luna Guzmán, Norma Irene; Ruiz Matus, Cuitláhuac; Díaz Quiñonez, José Alberto; Lopez Martinez, Irma; Kuri Morales, Pablo A. (15 April 2016). "Clinical and Epidemiological Characterization of Laboratory-Confirmed Autochthonous Cases of Zika Virus Disease in Mexico". PLOS Currents. 8. doi:10.1371/currents.outbreaks.a2fe1b3d6d71e24ad2b5afe982824053. ISSN 2157-3999. PMC 4844562. PMID 27158557. (Co-author)
