= Ana Pastor =

Ana Pastor may refer to:

- Ana Pastor (politician) (born 1957), a Spanish politician
- Ana Pastor (journalist) (born 1977), a Spanish journalist and anchorwoman
