= Ana Yurixi Leyva Piñón =

Mexican politician

- Born: 19 June 1973 (age 52); State of Mexico, Mexico
- Occupation: Politician
- Political party: PRD

Ana Yurixi Leyva Piñón (born 19 June 1973) is a Mexican politician from the Party of the Democratic Revolution. From 2006 to 2009 she served as Deputy of the LX Legislature of the Mexican Congress representing the State of Mexico.
