= Ana de Peralta =

Ecuadorian feminist

- Occupation: Feminist

Ana de Peralta was an Ecuadorian feminist active in Ambato, Ecuador. She protested the Royal Charter of 1752, which decreed that Mestizo women from wearing Spanish clothing. Peralta created one of the first feminist movements in Ecuador, leading 30,000 women in advocating for women's rights.
