= Ana Elia Paredes Arciga =

Mexican politician (born 1964)

- Born: 26 July 1964 (age 61); Jalisco, Mexico
- Occupation: Politician
- Political party: PAN

Ana Elia Paredes Arciga (born 26 July 1964) is a Mexican politician from the National Action Party. From 2009 to 2012 she served as Deputy of the LXI Legislature of the Mexican Congress representing Jalisco.
