= Ana Mureșan =

Romanian politician

Ana Mureșan (1925-2010) was a Romanian Politician (Communist).

She served as Minister of Education in 1966.
