= Ana Sánchez-Colberg =

Puerto Rican dancer

Ana Sánchez-Colberg is a Puerto Rican multidisciplinary artist working internationally.

== Career and Activities ==
Since 2016 Sánchez-Colberg moves fully into non-stage multidisciplinary/cross-arts works based on experimentation with generative compositional rules to create new forms of collaborative and participatory contemporary art. The works defy categorization as they bring together elements of fine and visual art, audio composition, movement, photography and film, live documentation in works that question the relationship between art institutions, the 'art-object' and the subjects involved in the creation and reception. This focus led the establishment of Vision.AI.R-e, a company developing multidisciplinary projects in audiovisual and new technologies.

The film 13.13.13 Archeology of a City has been screened in festivals worldwide. The short film 13 Variables [We are no longer who we were then, in dialogue with Jean Cocteau] was an official selection for the Athens Digital Arts Festival 2021 edition, ScreenDance Miami, as well as an official selection for the [Berlin International Art Film Festival. The work reimagines Cocteau's Jeune Homme et la Morte from the perspective of the Woman/Death. Love Letters to Ana was part of exhibition Coantivirus curated by NY20+ Nongyuan Culture in Chengdu, Sichuan, China. From there it joined the permanent collection of the channel Six Minutes Past Nine. The video series is a collaborations between nine international artists during the nine-week period of 'heavy lockdown' in the city of Athens. Ana is the lead artist who invited artists in 'lockdown cities' (from Seoul to Beijing, to Bangkok, Rome, Milan, San Antonio, to name some) to send her an audio 'love letter'. This love letter was used as an audio-score to 'go on a walk' (a poetic slightly ironic variation on the museum audio walk) in the conditions of 'containment'. The letters serve as a cross-border reflection on the shared and distinct conditions of 'lockdown' as well as an exercise in 'recuperation' amidst the loss. Other work in film and documentary includes the collaborations with filmmaker Chris Clow in film and documentary projects including Holds No Memory (2006) and 45,46,47 The Unbearable.

Event/Horizons was an international collaborative project bringing together over sixty-nine performing arts artists across the globe to share practices and concerns in response to the effect of the global pandemic. The project lasted for thirteen months, from October 2020 to December 2021 and concluded in an installation showcasing the work that was generated through the exchange.

In 2020 and 2022 she was artistic mentor for the project Grass Stains in Miami, Fl, an initiative of Pioneer Winter Collective. This gathering of twenty-two creators worked under the mentorship and facilitation of Sánchez-Colberg, in a laboratory setting over the course of one week. The MDC Live Arts Lab surrounding MDC Wolfson Campus (Building 1) hosted the artist.

J[us]t 5 in collaboration with art curators CHEAPART.GR evolved between 2017 and 2018 across various contexts including the biennale Art-Athena International Arts Fair and Return to Athens Festival. The works were a series of site-responsive public interventions throughout the city of Athens.

J[us]t 5 REDUX an immersive installation that 'collected' previous events into a single locality was presented within the Athens International Festival in June 2018. The work interweaved the collected narratives of the artist as she travelled through various cities- each city bringing her back to her relationship with Athens- raising questions about art, her collaborators, immigrant identity, the challenges and possibilities of life in the city in this precise historical moment. The artist created the participatory event as well as composed the audio soundscape/ score that the public used to follow the event.

The project Micropolies: Invisible Cities (February – May 2019) consisted of a series of public participatory interventions in the cities of Byblos (Lebanon), San Juan (Puerto Rico), Miami (Florida USA), Stockholm (Sweden), Athens (Greece). The project dispensed with the presence of the artist, the general public was invited to gather and 'perform' invisible solos by following an audio score (created by the artist) and a task score delivered through mobile technologies.

Sánchez-Colberg has worked with many international companies. She has produced four commissioned pieces for Ballet Concierto de Puerto Rico: Ojos Que No Ven (1992), which received the first prize in the Festival of Caribbean Choreographers and has been subsequently performed as part of Ballet Concierto's performances in New York's Lincoln Center and the Wuppertal Opera House, Sartorii (1994), Entre Huella y Pisada (1996), which received various awards from the Corporation for Music and Scenic Arts (NEA), and Tejiendo Memorias (1998). She produced a piece for the ballet of the Staatstheater Cottbus, es lasst sich nicht lesen.. with support from the British Council (Berlin). Strange Muse, produced in June 1997, was commissioned by the Institute of Culture of Puerto Rico in collaboration with musicians from the Puerto Rico Philharmonic Orchestra. In 1997 she premiered a work for Foreign Bodies Dance Company developed with support from East Midlands Arts. She has also choreographed Recollections (1999) for Andanza (Puerto Rico), and Cuerpos (no) Mienten (2012) a group dance for seven dancers with an original composition for three pianos for CoDA 21 (Puerto Rico). She was resident choreographer with Andanza, Contemporary Dance Company of Puerto Rico 2022-23 where she has choreographed Janus (2022), Tales of Mother Goose (2022), a collaboration with the Symphony Orchestra of Puerto Rico and Quincunx(2023). With Andanza, she directed and curated Festival Video [An]Danza International. She established Festival Videodanza de Puerto Rico, an initiative of Vision.AI.R-e.

From 2023-2025 she was part of the Faculty of Dance at Banff Centre for Arts and Creativity where she mentored the Final Tuning Artistic Residency.

== Artistic Research and Pedagogy ==
Sanchez-Colberg was coordinator of the BA Dance (Hons) at Laban (now Trinity/Laban, London) from 1994 to 2002. In 2002 she designs and leads the MA European Dance Theatre Practice and contributes to the MA Choreography and Pd D supervision. In 2005 she takes on the position of coordinator of the MA Performance Practices and Research at Royal Central School of Speech and Drama (London), where she also leads the MPHil/Ph D degrees until 2009. As part of her position of Professor of Choreography and Composition at the University Dance and Circus Stockholm (2009–2013), Sánchez-Colberg worked in various interdisciplinary projects between dance and new circus including a project with VR/XR director Chris Lane introducing VR to circus artists (October 2021). She was the program coordinator of the MA in Contemporary Circus Practices at University of the Arts, Stockholm (2020-2022).

Sánchez-Colberg is a guest teacher in dance schools and festivals and has taught in the Tanzwochen/Vienna, International Festival of Theatre in Bogota, Colombia, Helsinki Theatre Academy, University College Dance Stockholm, and the Hong Kong Academy of Performing Arts, amongst others. She was also Visiting Professor of Theatre at the Estonia Academy of Music and Theatre (2021-2022) contributing to the MA Contemporary Physical Performance Practices and the MPhi/PhD Research degrees.

== Work in theatre and performance ==
Sánchez-Colberg holds a BA (Hons) from the University of Pennsylvania.

As movement director for the physical theatre company Intuitions, she was involved in three productions: Alice in Wonderland (1983) (based on the Andre Gregory Performing Garage text of the 1970s), Bacchae – in 84, and Buchner's Woyzzeck(1984) She has also worked with London-based Rougue 28 Theatre Company as performer and movement advisor between 2006 and 2008. Sánchez-Colberg was course leader of the MA Performance Practices and Research at Central School of Speech and Drama (2005–2008).

She is the author of the essay defining physical theatre practice Altered States and Sublimal Spaces: Charting the Road towards a Physical Theatre. First published in the journal Performance Research in 1996, the essay is now included in the reader Physical Theatres: A Critical Reader, edited by John Keefe and Simon Murray.
