= Ana Lima =

Ana Lima may refer to:

- Ana Lima (actress) (born 1973), Brazilian actress
- Ana Lima (volleyball) (born 1969), Brazilian volleyball player
- Ana Clara Lima (born 1997), Brazilian reporter and presenter
- Ana Luiza Lima (born 1973), Brazilian artistic gymnast
