= Ana Eduarda Santos =

Portuguese writer

Ana Eduarda Santos (Lisbon, 1983) is a Portuguese writer of novels, plays and translations.

She was the youngest winner ever of the Revelation Prize/Fiction - First Novel (Prémio Revelação APE) in 1999, aged 16 for Luz e Sombra (Light and Shadow). She has also won the Eça de Queiroz Award for Short Stories (2001) and the Júlio Graça Award for Short Stories (2003).

Santos has published two novels, a play, and a collection of short stories in Portugal, as well as a play in France, Calluna Vulgaris (Gare au Théâtre), which premiered in Paris in 2001.

She has also translated into Portuguese some works from the Italian, among which are Umberto Eco's A Passo di Gambero and Ugo Foscolo's Sonets.
