= Ana Denicola =

Uruguayan pharmacist (born 1959)

Dr. Ana Denicola
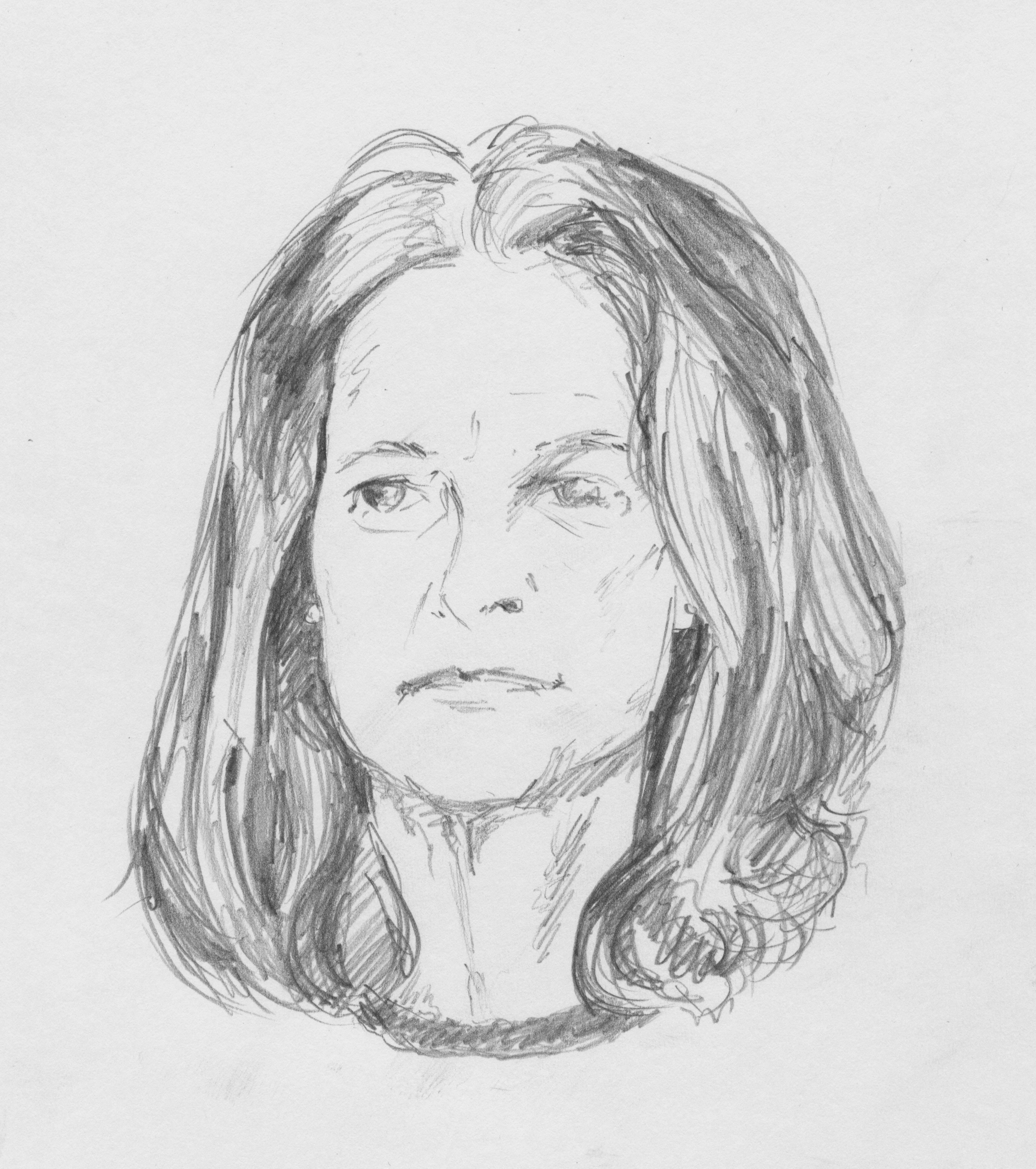
- Born: Ana Denicola Cresi; 30 September 1959 (age 66); Montevideo
- Education: University of the Republic
- Occupations: Pharmacist and chemical engineer
- Awards: Premio Morosoli

Ana Denicola (born 30 September 1959) is an Uruguayan pharmacist, chemical researcher and professor in the science faculty at the University of the Uruguayan Republic, from 2005 to 2010 she was head of the faculty there. She is a Grade 5 teacher at that faculty and she also works as a first-level researcher in the Basic Sciences Developmental Program (PEDECIBA) and the National Research System of the Uruguayan Agency of Research and Innovation, SNI level III. From 2000 to 2002, Denicola was president of the Uruguayan Society for the Biosciences and she is a full member of the National Academy of Sciences of Uruguay.

== Life and career ==
Denicola possesses a master's degree in chemistry from the University of the Uruguayan Republic and a Ph.D. in biochemistry from Virginia Tech in 1989. Her field of research is the characterization of kinetic and physicochemical free radicals produced in vivo, particularly in oxygen and nitrogen. She has over 60 published articles. Currently, she is a research director at the University of the Uruguayan Republic.

== Awards ==
In 2009, she received the L’Oréal-UNESCO Prize “Women and Science” for her contributions to scientific development in Uruguay.

In 2014, she received the Morosoli de Plata award in the area of Science and Technology.
