= Ana Teresa Velázquez Beeck =

Mexican politician

- Born: 15 July 1982 (age 43); Aguascalientes, Aguascalientes, Mexico
- Occupation: Politician
- Political party: PVEM

Ana Teresa Velázquez Beeck (born 15 July 1982) is a Mexican politician from the Ecologist Green Party of Mexico. From 2006 to 2009 she served as Deputy of the LX Legislature of the Mexican Congress representing Coahuila.
