= Ana Lilić =

Serbian footballer (born 1993)

Personal information
- Date of birth: 28 September 1993 (age 33)
- Position: Midfielder

Team information
- Current team: ŽFK Mašinac PZP Niš

Senior career*
Years	Team	Apps	(Gls)
- ŽFK Mašinac PZP Niš

International career^{‡}
- Serbia
- * Club domestic league appearances and goals as of 19:48, 30 August 2019 (UTC) ‡ National team caps and goals as of 19:48, 30 August 2019 (UTC)

Ana Lilić (Serbian Cyrillic: Ана Лилић; born 28 September 1993) is a Serbian footballer who plays as a midfielder and has appeared for the Serbia women's national team.

== Career ==
Lilić has been capped for the Serbia national team, appearing for the team during the 2019 FIFA Women's World Cup qualifying cycle.
