= Ana María López =

Ana Maria Lopez may refer to:

- Ana María López Colomé (born 1944), Mexican biochemist
- Ana María López Calleja (born 1968), Spanish Paralympic athlete
