= Ana Mendoza =

Ana Mendoza or Ana de Mendoza may refer to:

- Ana Mendoza (swimmer) (born 1970), Mexican swimmer
- Ana Mendoza (footballer) (born 2005), Mexican football player
- Ana de Mendoza y de Silva, Princess of Éboli (1540–1592) Spanish aristocrat
- Ana de Mendoza y Enríquez de Cabrera, 6th Duchess of the Infantado (1544–1633), 6th Duchess of the Infantado from 1601 to 1633
