= Ana Veselinova =

Macedonian footballer

Personal information
- Date of birth: 7 October 1995 (age 31)
- Position: Defender

International career^{‡}
Years	Team	Apps	(Gls)
2011	North Macedonia U-17	2	(0)
2013	North Macedonia U-19	1	(0)
2013–2016	North Macedonia	9	(0)
- ‡ National team caps and goals as of 13:24, 19 September 2021 (UTC)

Ana Veselinova (born 7 October 1995) is a Macedonian footballer who plays as a defender for the North Macedonia national team.

== International career ==
Veselinova made her debut for the North Macedonia national team on 13 February 2014, against Spain.
