= Ana Andreazza =

Brazilian–Canadian pharmacologist

- Born: Brazil

Academic background
- Education: BSc, Biotechnology, University of Caxias do Sul; MSc, PhD, Federal University of Rio Grande do Sul

Ana Cristina Andreazza is a Brazilian–Canadian pharmacologist. She is a Professor in the Department of Pharmacology and Toxicology at the University of Toronto.

== Early life and education ==
Andreazza received her Bachelor in Pharmacy degree from the University of Caxias do Sul and her Master's degree and PhD in biochemistry from the Federal University of Rio Grande do Sul. Following this, she completed her postdoctoral fellowships in Brazil and at the University of British Columbia. In 2009, she received a Trainee Award from the Michael Smith Foundation for Health Research for identifying biomarkers associated with the diagnosis and illness progression of mood disorders.

== Career ==
As a Professor at the University of Toronto, Andreazza demonstrated that there was increased mitochondrial dysfunction and redox modulations in the brain and blood cells of patients with mood disorders. She also used blood samples and advanced stem-cell technology to grow neurons and entire brains to investigate how mitochondrial weakness leads to disrupted neurotransmission and researching potential treatments. In 2016, Andreazza was named a Canada Research Chair in Molecular Pharmacology of Mood Disorders. Following this, she co-founded mitoNET with the MitoCanada Foundation "to provide clinicians with the tools and knowledge to assess mitochondrial health as part of routine care." In 2018, she was recognized as one of Canada's Top 40 Under 40 and later named Canada’s first chair to support research into mitochondrial research.

During the COVID-19 pandemic, Andreazza applied her research into the acai berry extract’s effect as a possible anti-inflammatory therapy for mental health disorders towards the coronavirus. She began a trial involving acai pills and placebo pill with patients who had tested positive for COVID-19 and were isolated at home. As a result of her research into the effects of mitochondrial dysfunction on neurotransmission phenotypes, Andreazza was appointed to the Royal Society of Canada’s College of New Scholars, Artists and Scientists.
