= Ana Luz Lobato =

Mexican politician

- Born: 27 April 1970 (age 56); Guerrero, Mexico
- Occupation: Politician
- Political party: PRD (1989–2012); PRI (2012–present)

Ana Luz Lobato Ramírez (born 27 April 1970) is a Mexican politician from the Institutional Revolutionary Party (formerly from the Party of the Democratic Revolution). From 2009 to 2012 she served as Deputy of the LXI Legislature of the Mexican Congress representing Guerrero.
