= Ana Martins Marques =

Brazilian poet

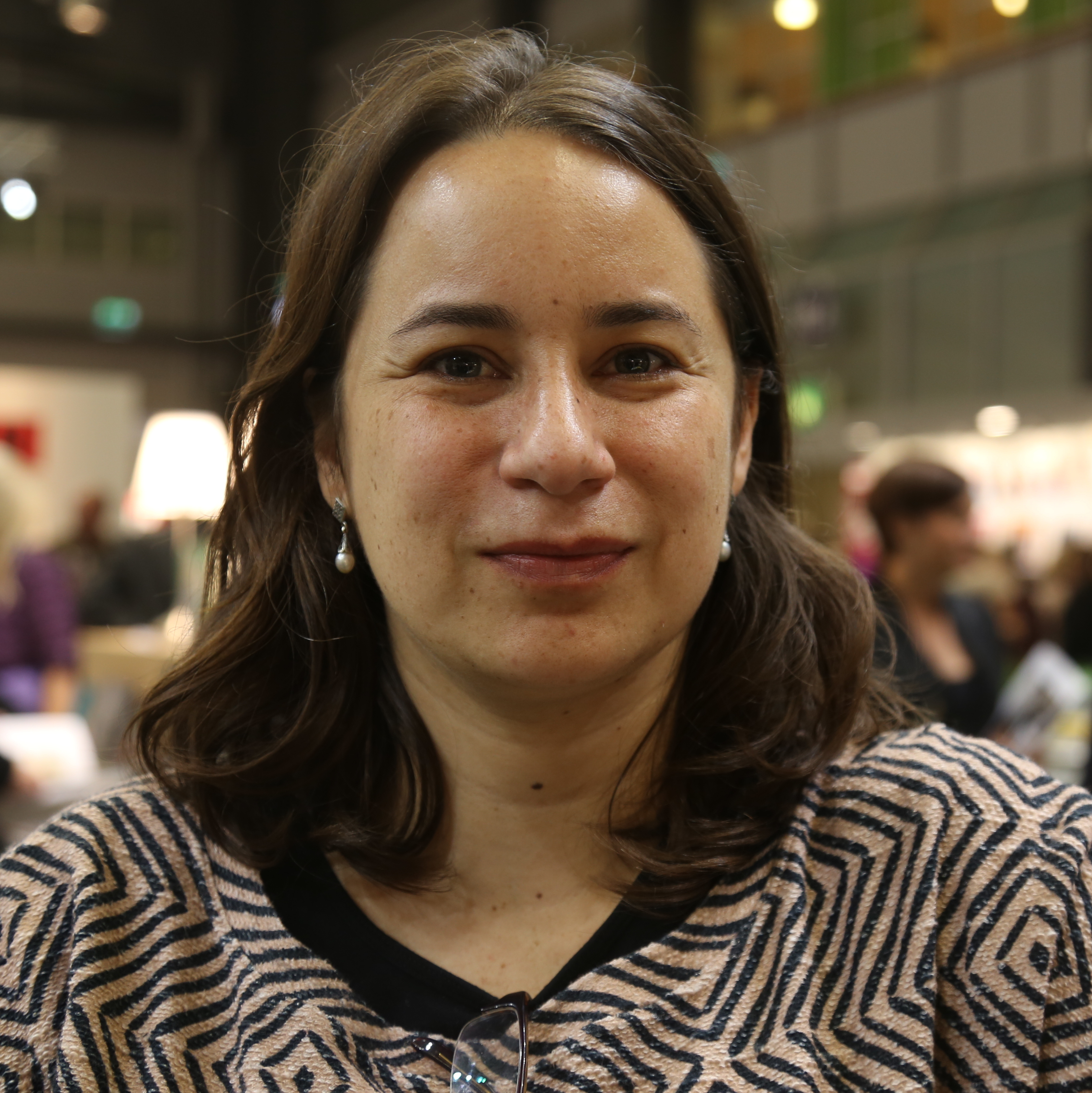
- Ana Martins Marques at the 2014 Gothenburg Book Fair
- Born: November 7, 1977 (age 48); Belo Horizonte
- Education: Federal University of Minas Gerais
- Occupation: Poet

Ana Martins Marques (born November 7, 1977) is a Brazilian poet.

== Life ==
Marques was born in Belo Horizonte. She has a master's degree in literature and a doctorate in compared literature at the Federal University of Minas Gerais. She works as an editor and proofreader for the Minas Gerais State Legislative Assembly.

Her first book, A vida submarina (2009), is a collection of poems awarded the Prêmio Cidade de Belo Horizonte in 2007 and 2008. She was also awarded the Prêmio Alphonsus de Guimaraens, for her second book, Da arte das armadilhas (2011). In 2013, she wrote a doctoral thesis entitled Paisagem com figuras: fotografia na literatura contemporânea on photography in the literature of poets W.G. Sebald, Bernardo Carvalho, Alan Paul and Orhan Pamuk.

== Published works ==
- 2009 – A vida submarina (Scriptum)
- 2011 – Da arte das armadilhas (Companhia das Letras)
- 2015 – O Livro das Semelhanças (Companhia das Letras)
- 2016 – Duas Janelas – com Marcos Siscar (Luna Parque Edições)
- 2017 – Como se fosse a casa (uma correspondência) – with Eduardo Jorge (Relicário)
- 2019 – Livro dos jardins (Quelonio)
- 2021 – Risque esta palavra (Companhia das Letras)

=== Works in English ===
- 2017 – This House: Selected poems by Ana Martins Marques - translated by Elisa Wouk Almino (Scrambler Books)
