= Ana Lemos =

Ana Lemos may refer to:

- Ana Cláudia Lemos (born 1988), Brazilian track and field athlete
- Ana Margot Lemos (born 1986), Colombian weightlifter
- Ana Amélia Lemos (born 1945), Brazilian journalist and politician
