= Ana Barros =

Ana Barros may refer to:

- Ana Barros (cyclist) (born 1973), Portuguese cyclist
- Ana Barros (handballer) (born 1993), Angolan handball player
- Ana Barros (swimmer) (born 1969), Portuguese swimmer
- Ana P. Barros, American civil and environmental engineer
- Ana Beatriz Barros (born 1982), Brazilian model
- Ana Lúcia Barros (born 1965), Brazilian volleyball player
