= Ana García Armada =

Spanish electrical engineer

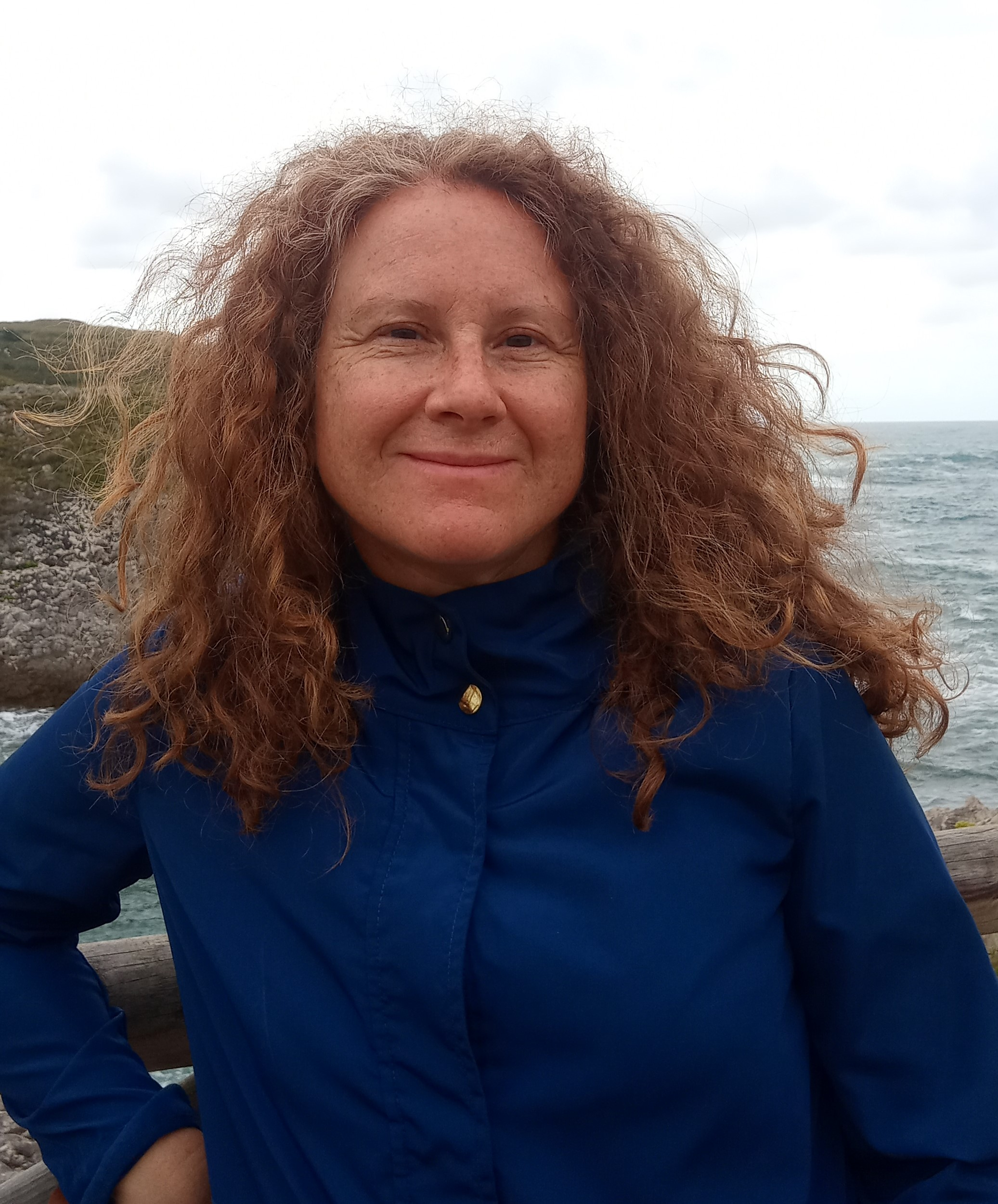
García in 2020

Ana García Armada is a Spanish electrical engineer specializing in Wireless communication, especially involving multi-carrier and multi-antenna communications, signal processing, and orthogonal frequency-division multiplexing. She is a professor at Charles III University of Madrid.

García earned a licenciate from the Technical University of Madrid in 1994, and completed her Ph.D. there in 1998. Her doctoral dissertation, Contribución al desarrollo de técnicas de prototipado rápido de sistemas de comunicaciones, was directed by Miguel Calvo Ramón. In the same year she joined the academic staff of Charles III University. She was named an IEEE Fellow, in the 2024 class of fellows, "for contributions to wireless communications transceivers".
