= Ana Rita Machado =

Portuguese actress

Ana Rita Gomes Machado (born 17 August 1991 in Lisbon) is a Portuguese television actress. In 2001, she appeared as "Pipa" in the soap opera Ganância (Greed). In 2002, she appeared in TVI's Sonhos Traídos.
