= Ana María Berlanga =

Mexican pedagogue (1880–1935)

- Born: Ana María Berlanga Guerrero; April 8, 1880; Montemorelos, Nuevo León
- Died: 1935; Mexico City
- Other name: Ana María Berlanga de Martínez
- Education: Escuela Normal Monterrey
- Occupations: teacher, pedagogue
- Parent(s): David Berlanga; Francisca Guerrero

Ana María Berlanga Guerrero (8 April 1880 – 1935) was a Mexican pedagogue with an extensive career in teaching, administration and management of educational institutions. She is recognized for having been the first Mexican educatress to specialize in teaching people with hearing disabilities and their social inclusion.

== Biography ==
She was the eldest daughter of David Berlanga, a factory worker, and Francisca Guerrero. The couple also had two boys and another girl. At just twelve years old and with the help of her mother, she ran for the position of principal at her local school and won by competitive examination. For this reason, she moved to study at the Normal School of Monterrey and graduated in 1895. Berlanga was also an advocate for inclusion and equity in education, working to promote quality education for all girls and boys, regardless of socioeconomic or cultural background.

=== Trajectory ===
She was a primary school teacher in rural areas in the states of San Luis Potosí and Coahuila. She became a principal in Villa Juárez and in Torreón. In 1907, she was appointed professor at the Normal School of Saltillo and in 1911, she was appointed principal of the Elementary School No. 2.

At the beginning of 1912, she was appointed principal of the Normal School for Teachers. With this position, she attended the Xalapa Pedagogy Congress, where she represented the state of San Luis Potosí. Two women attended this Congress. In this way, the female presence in education began to take shape. During this position, she modernized teaching methods. At the same time that she served as principal of the school, she continued to teach manual labor classes, particularly teaching sewing. During the years that she was principal, she increased the number of students, highlighting the increase of women.

=== Mexican Revolutionary movement ===
Ana María Berlanga was a sympathizer of the armed movement against Porfirio Díaz. In the National Archives, there is the letter that she wrote to Francisco I. Madero in 1911, in which she expressed her support for his cause and warned him not to go to Mexico City until Porfirio Díaz left the power.

After Madero's death, Victoriano Huerta assumed the presidency of the Republic and with this there was a change in the States that influenced educational institutions and generated movements in the management staff of Normal Schools. Berlanga left her position and moved to Mexico City, to join the revolutionaries. In 1915, she confronted Francisco Villa for the assassination order against her brother David G. Berlanga and participated actively against the regime of general Victoriano Huerta.

After the fall of Victoriano Huerta, she resumed her teaching work and was appointed professor of Botany, Cosmography, Psychology, and Geography at the Normal School of Mexico.

== Social inclusion of people with hearing disabilities ==
In 1918 she was assigned as principal of the National School for the Deaf-Mutes. During her administration, a complete overhaul of the curriculum was made, shifting the emphasis from earlier elementary education to a focus on acquiring practical skills, especially speaking skills and learning a trade. To elaborate on this plan, she made observations in the educational practice, as well as in the experience of the teachers and also reviewed the school files and consulted the statistics to know the results obtained. Likewise, she consulted the available material, and all of this allowed the production of this study plan and programs. In order for said plan to work optimally, she drew up a regulation that included 16 articles with the intention of regulating education.

Due to the revolutionary conflict, there was no equipment or material at the National School for Deaf-Mutes; however, in other nearby institutions this limitation did not exist, which is why the necessary agreements were signed so that the students received training that would allow them to earn a living. She even reached an agreement that allowed a group of deaf youth to receive specialized training in the workshops of the Practical School of Engineers. The deaf students who benefited from this program because, in addition to the technical skills they acquired, they were allowed to live with other non-deaf students in the workplace, which was very useful for their future.

As part of her preparation, she was a Mexican delegate to the Congress of Deaf-Mutes in Philadelphia, United States.
