= Ana Roca =

Croatian basketball player

Personal information
- Born: October 16, 1982 (age 44) Šibenik, SFR Yugoslavia
- Listed height: 184 cm (6 ft 0 in)

Career information
- WNBA draft: 2003: undrafted
- Playing career: –2007
- Position: Forward

Career history
- 2000–2002: Jolly JBS
- 2005–2007: Vidici Dalmostan
Medals
Women's basketball
Representing Croatia
Mediterranean Games
Silver medal – second place	2005 Almería

Ana Roca (born 16 October 1982 in Šibenik, SFR Yugoslavia) is a Croatian female professional basketball player.
