= Ana María Llona Málaga =

Peruvian poet (born 1936)

Ana María Llona Málaga (born 1936 in Lima, Perú) is a Peruvian poet. She published her first book of poetry, Animal tan Albo, in 2009. She is currently working on her second book.

== Bibliography ==
- Animal tan Albo (Lima, 2009), ISBN 978-612-45602-0-0
