= Ana Galán =

Spanish writer

Ana Galán (born 3 September 1964) is a Spanish writer now living in the United States. Writing in both Spanish and English, she is essentially a children's writer but also writes humorous books for adults.

Galán was born in Oviedo, Spain. She moved to New York where she began her work as a translator in 1989. since 2002 Galán has been working for the US company Scholastic Books where she has published 25 works.

== Books ==
- Galan, Ana (2006). Hilario El Veterinario (in Spanish). Buenos Aires: Alparamis. ISBN 978-987-1234-07-3.
- Galan, Alvaro; Galan, Ana; Simpson, Steve (2009). Billy Bully: A school-yard counting tale. New York, NY: Scholastic Inc. ISBN 978-0-545-11012-9.
- Galán, Ana; Enríquez, Manuel (2012). Cierra los ojos y mírame (in Spanish). Barcelona: Destino. ISBN 978-84-08-00981-8.
- Galán, Ana; Pino, Pablo; Galán, Ana (2012). Mondragó: La gran prueba (in Spanish) (2. ed.). León, Spain: Everest. ISBN 978-84-441-4812-0.
- Galán, Ana; Pino, Pablo; Galán, Ana (2012). Mondragó: El Baobab (in Spanish) (2. ed.). León, Spain: Everest. ISBN 978-84-441-4814-4.
- Galán, Ana (2013). Little Animals Lost. New York, NY: Scholastic, Inc. ISBN 978-0-545-49835-7.
- Galan, Ana (2013). Mondragó: El arbopán (in Spanish). León, Spain: Editorial Everest. ISBN 978-84-441-4933-2.
- Galán, Ana; Mazali, Gustavo (2014). Eola y el misterio del periquito enfermo (in Spanish). Barcelona: Destino. ISBN 978-84-08-12326-2.
- Galán, Ana; Luján, Rodrigo (2017). ¡Es la hora de los esqueletos! [It's Skeleton Time!] (in Spanish). New York, NY: Scholastic Inc. ISBN 978-1-338-18785-4.
- Galán, Ana (2017). Si yo fuera un león (in Spanish). Barcelona: Almadraba. ISBN 978-84-15207-27-6.
- Galán, Ana (2017). Si yo fuera un koala (in Spanish). Barcelona: Almadraba. ISBN 978-84-948211-1-0.
