= Ana Teresa Barboza =

Peruvian textile artist

- Born: 1981 (age 44–45); Lima, Peru

Ana Teresa Barboza (born 1981) is a Peruvian textile artist.

Barboza was born and raised in Lima, Peru. She attended the Pontifical Catholic University of Peru (PCUP). Her works are "three-dimensional textile art that depicts natural forms such as plant life and landscapes." She is "known for her "labour-intensive, mixed-media works that use patchwork, knitting or embroidery." Her 2018 work, Torcer, is "made from woven fabric, wool and alpaca embroidered onto a digital photographic print." She sometime combines botanically dyed materials with her botanical subject matter. Her inspiration comes from landscapes, nature and natural proceses.
