= Ana Cecilia Blum =

Ecuadorian writer and journalist

Ana Cecilia Blum (born March 17, 1972) is an Ecuadorian writer and journalist, born in Guayaquil.

She studied Political and Social Sciences at the Vicente Rocafuerte Lay University of Guayaquil. She worked for several media outlets, and pursued further studies in literature at the Catholic University of Guayaquil, Andean University of Quito, the FLACSO University of Guayaquil, and Colorado State University. She currently lives between Ecuador and the United States. She read her work at the Library of Congress in 2014, for an event focused on Latin American poetry.

== Works ==
- Descanso sobre mi sombra (1995)
- Donde duerme el sueño (2005)
- I am opposed
- En estas tierras
- Libre de Espanto (2012)
- Absurdities (2014)
- Áncoras (2015)
- Rituales (2016)
