= Ana Bereciartúa =

Spanish social worker and politician (1936–2023)

Member of the Basque Parliament
- In office 10 July 1989 – 3 September 1990
- In office 31 March 1980 – 1 October 1986

Personal details
- Born: Sabina Ana María Bereciartúa Arriarán; 28 June 1936 Pasaia, Spain
- Died: 20 November 2023 (aged 87) San Sebastián, Spain
- Party: PNV (until 1986); EA (1986–2009); Hamaikabat (2009–2011)
- Education: University of the Basque Country
- Occupation: Social worker

Sabina Ana María Bereciartúa Arriarán (28 June 1936 – 20 November 2023) was a Spanish social worker and politician. A member of the Basque Nationalist Party and later Eusko Alkartasuna, she served in the Basque Parliament from 1980 to 1986 and again from 1989 to 1990.

Bereciartúa died in San Sebastián on 20 November 2023, at the age of 87.
