= Ana Tristany =

Portuguese artist (born 1966)

- Born: Ana Tristany; 1966 (age 59–60); Lisbon, Portugal
- Occupations: sculptor, painter, professor
- Years active: 1995–present

Ana Tristany (born 1966) is a Portuguese artist who has won awards for both her paintings and teaching. Her work has been featured on magazine covers and is described as "open work" beyond abstract expressionism, which allows the viewer to become an active participant in the creation process.

== Biography ==
Ana Tristany was born in 1966 in Lisbon, Portugal. She graduated in 1989 from the School of Fine Arts at the University of Lisbon. Her early works were in stone sculpture, for which she completed a specialization course in 1992. She opened an advertising company and her artwork has appeared on the covers of such magazines as Polymer Chemistry (2013) and Journal of Physical Chemistry (2008). In addition, she has taught art for two decades at the Colégio Militar (Military College) of Lisbon to both adults and children.

While living in Canada, she developed an interest in the works of Morris Louis and Jackson Pollock. Utilizing their drip technique, she created a "steered drip" process which integrates a level of sculpting into her painting. In 2008, when she opened her solo exhibit “À Chuva, ao Sol e ao Vento” (“Under the Rain, the Sun and the Wind”), her work was described by Álvaro Lobato de Faria, the director of the Movimento Arte Contemporânea MAC (Contemporary Art Movement), as beyond abstract expressionism and more broadly could be categorized by "open work" as it was described by Umberto Eco. In 1962, Eco postulated that "open work" caused the spectator to become an active participant in the construction and implementation of the painting. The exhibit won the 2009 Painting prize from MAC and a featured article about her work appeared in Yareah Magazine.

In both 2011 and 2012, Tristany received an award from MAC for her innovative art teaching for children. In 2013, Tristany held a solo showing at the Forte do Bom Sucesso in Lisbon.
