= Ana Galindo =

Ana Galindo may refer to:

- Ana Galindo (swimmer) (born 1987), Honduran swimmer
- Ana Galindo (gymnast) (born 2003), Mexican rhythmic gymnast
- Ana Galindo (alpine skier) (born 1973), Spanish alpine skier
- Ana Galindo (football manager) (born 1985), Mexican Football Manager
- Anaida Poilievre (née Galindo, born 1986 or 1987) Canadian political staffer
