= Ana María Rojas Ruiz =

Mexican politician

- Born: 20 January 1969 (age 57); Chiapas, Mexico
- Occupation: Politician
- Political party: PRI

Ana María Rojas Ruiz (born 20 January 1969) is a Mexican politician from the Institutional Revolutionary Party. From 2009 to 2012 she served as Deputy of the LXI Legislature of the Mexican Congress representing Chiapas.
