= Ana Eurídice Eufrosina de Barandas =

Brazilian writer

Ana Eurídice Eufrosina de Barandas (September 6, 1806 - June 23, 1863) was a Brazilian poet, short story writer and feminist author. She has been called the first Brazilian woman novelist.

== Life ==
Ana de Barandas was born in Porto Alegre in 1806. She was born into a conservative middle-class Portuguese family, the daughter of Joaquim da Fonseca Barandas, a Portuguese surgeon, and his wife Ana Felícia do Nascimento. In 1822, aged 16, she married a Portuguese lawyer, Joaquim Pena Penalta, with whom she had two daughters and a son who died in infancy. Ana and her husband lived in Rio de Janeiro to escape the Farroupilha War, and returned to Porto Alegre in 1841. She divorced her husband in 1841, managing to secure full responsibility for her two surviving children as well as keeping property acquired from the marriage.

de Barandas is likely to have known the feminist writer Nísia Floresta. She began to write during the Farroupilha War, and some writings were collected and published in Ramalhete (1845). Contained in the volume were: some love sonnets; 'a queda de Safo', an allegorical story; 'Lembrança saudosa', an account of the destruction of her childhood home in Belmonte; 'Eugênia ou a Filósofa apaixonada', a romantic story; and 'Diálogos', a philosophical dialogue in which a young women Mariana argues against her father and cousin to defend the reasoning abilities of women and the appropriateness of women's participation in political debate.

The date of her death is unknown, though has sometimes been given as 1856.

== Works ==
- O ramalhete ou flores escolhidas no jardim da imaginação [The bouquet, or flowers chosen from the garden of imagination]. 1845. 2nd ed. (ed. Hilda Hübner Flores) O ramalhete. Porto Alegre, RS, Brasil: Nova Dimensão: EDIPUCRS, 1990.
