= Ana Whiterose =

- Born: Anastacia Gaillard; February 5, 2001 (age 25); Montreux, Switzerland
- Genres: Pop
- Occupations: Musician; singer; songwriter
- Instruments: Vocals; keyboards
- Years active: 2019–present
- Label: The Hana Road Music Group
- Website: http://anawhiterose.com/

Ana Whiterose (born February 5, 2001) is a Swiss singer and songwriter. Her songs have been near the top of the Swiss radio charts, won awards, and received media coverage.

== Early life ==
Anastacia Gaillard was born on February 5, 2001, in Montreux, Switzerland. Her father is Swiss-Italian, while her mother is Russian.

Whiterose's first musical success occurred during Kids Voice Tour competition in 2016 where she made it to the finals twice.

Anastacia is a member of Little Dreams Foundation, founded by Phil Collins and Orianne Collins, also a member of LEGEND Performing Arts Foundation.

== Career ==
In 2019, Whiterose signed with a Swiss independent record label, The Hana Road Music Group. The same year, she released her debut single "Behind the Moon". It entered the Swiss radio chart at #62 and became the 'Song of the Day' on one of the biggest Swiss radio stations, SRF3.

The following single "Wanted to Tell You", grabbed the attention of press media such as Cosmopolitan and OK!.

In 2021, Ana Whiterose's music video for her single "Breaking" won silver screenings at the Berlin Music Video Awards 2021. The following artists were included in the same category: Alan Walker, David Guetta, Disclosure and more.

== Discography ==
Singles
Year	Title
2019	"Behind the Moon"
2020	"Wanted to Tell You"
2020	"Luxor Mood"
2020	"Ying Yang"
2020	"Just For a Night"
2020	"Staring at My Face"
2021	"Breaking"
2021	"Breaking" (Danny Burg Remix)
2021	"Stone Cold Heart"
2021	"Stone Cold Heart" (Danny Burg Remix)
2021	"Stone Cold Heart" Remix ft. Rudenko
2021	"Call Me"
2021	"Blind"
2022	"Good Times" (with Soundland)
