= Ana Rita Esgário =

Brazilian politician

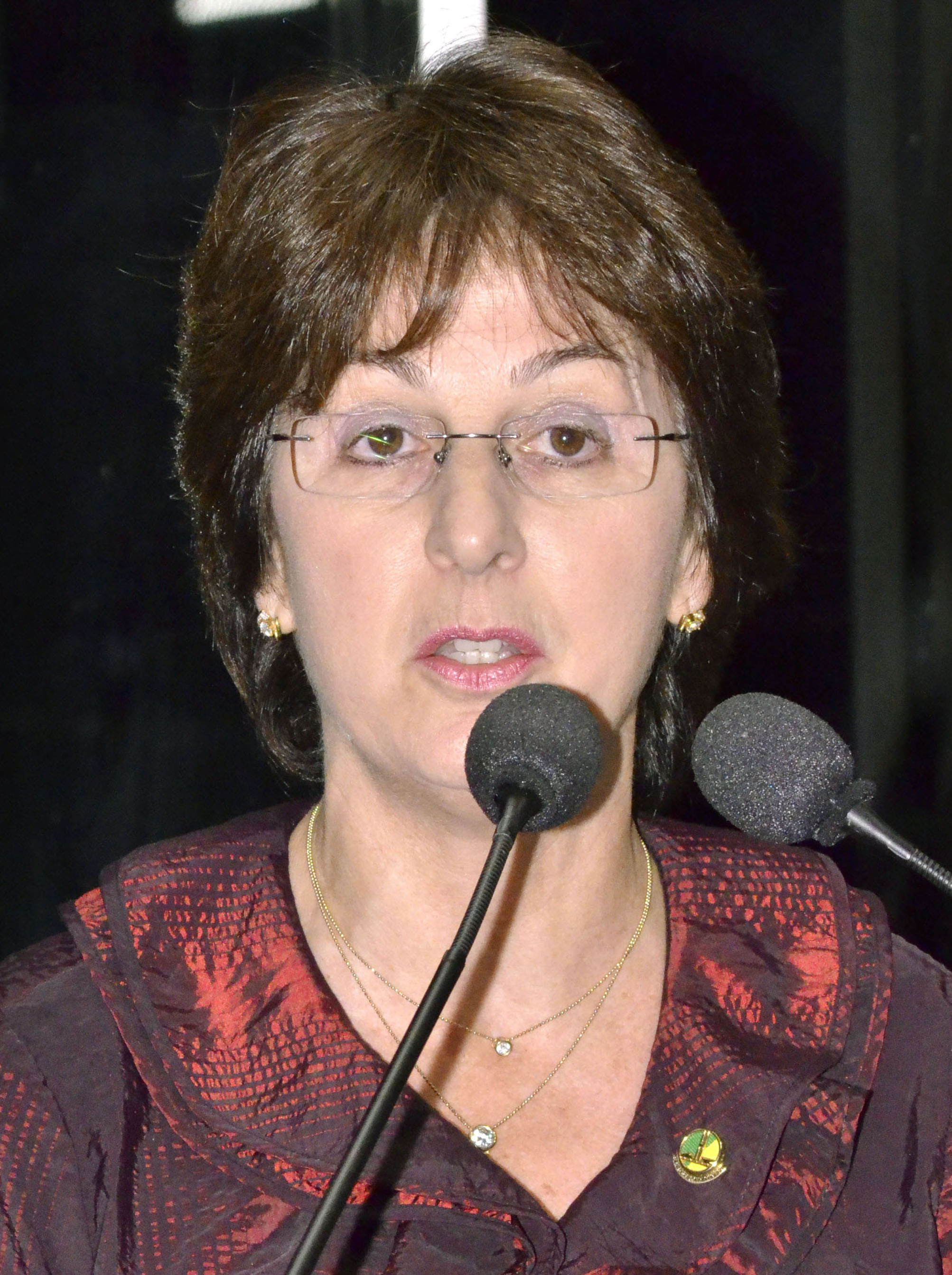

Senator from Espírito Santo
- In office January 3, 2011 – February 1, 2015

Personal details
- Born: July 26, 1958 (age 67) Conceição do Castelo, Espírito Santo
- Party: Workers' Party
- Profession: social worker

Ana Rita Esgário (born July 26, 1958) is a Brazilian social worker and politician. She represented Espírito Santo in the Federal Senate from 2011 to 2015. She is a member of the Workers' Party.
