= Ana Christensen =

- Born: California
- Occupation: singer-songwriter
- Years active: 1988–1994
- Labels: CBS, Festival

Ana Christensen is an American-born, Australian singer-songwriter, best known for her 1990 single "Isolate Your Heart".

== Background ==
Ana Christensen was born in California in 1960 and moved to Australia in the late 1970s.

Christensen first started singing in Townsville, Queensland in 1980, first as a soloist then with Michael Heytman. In 1986, Christensen won Female Vocal, Gospel Solo, Bush Ballad Duo with Michael and the overall Grand Prize at the Charters Towers Country Music Festival.

This resulted in a tour with Freddy Fender and Ayr's Saddle Tramps in June 1986. In 1987, Heytman and Christensen once again won the Duo at Charters Towers, and Christensenalso took out first place in Female Vocal.

In 1988, Christensen released her debut album, Deep in the Night and in early 1990, she signed to CBS. Through CBS, she released the album Brave New World in 1990.

In 1994, Christensen moved to be with her family in the United States and left the music industry.

== Discography ==
=== Studio albums ===
List of albums, with Australian chart positions
Title	Album details	Peak chart positions
Title	Album details	AUS
Deep in the Night	Released: 1988; Label: Nicholls N' Dimes Records (VPL1 0736); Format: LP, Cassette, CD	-
Brave New World	Released: November 1990; Label: CBS (467349 1, 467349 2, 467349 4); Format: LP, Cassette, CD	104
Not All Monkeys Are Right Handed	Released: November 1994; Label: Festival Records (D 31210); Format: CD	164

=== Singles ===
List of singles, with selected chart positions
Year	Title	Peak chart positions	Album
Year	Title	AUS	Album
1988	"Afraid of the Dark"	-	Deep in the Night
1990	"Isolate Your Heart"	66	Brave New World
1990	"Brave New World"	166	Brave New World
1991	"Like a Rolling Stone"	94	Brave New World
1994	"Cultivate the Wild"	-	Not All Monkeys Are Right Handed
1994	"I Will Hold You Up"	-	Not All Monkeys Are Right Handed
