= Ana Corrales =

American technology executive

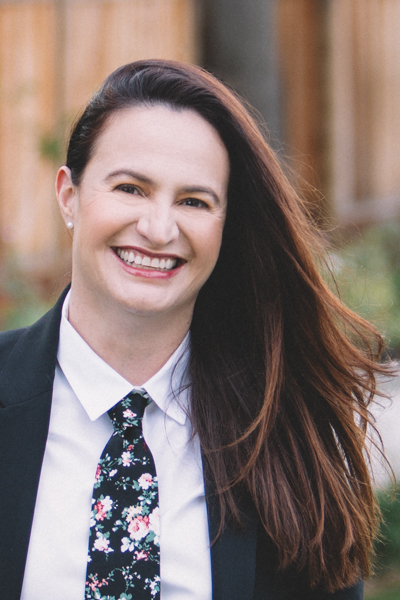
- Education: University of Washington; Stanford University
- Occupation: Business executive
- Children: 2

Ana Corrales is an American business executive, the Chief Operating Officer for Google's Consumer Hardware business, and oversees the Google Store. She has been recognized by Forbes as one of the 50 Most Powerful Latinas in Business, as one of the Most Influential Women in the Bay Area by the San Francisco Business Times, and as a Top 50 Most Powerful Women in Technology by the National Diversity Council. Corrales is married and has two children.

== Early life and education ==
Corrales grew up in San Jose, Costa Rica. Her father is an engineer, entrepreneur, and inventor in the energy industry. Her mother has a doctorate in Botany and served as the Dean of La Universidad de Costa Rica and the Minister of Science and Technology in Costa Rica.

Corrales moved to the United States to attend the University of Washington where she received her bachelor's in economics. She attended Stanford University where she received a master's of engineering.

== Career ==
At Google, Corrales oversees the development of Google hardware and Nest products and oversees Google's first-party retail channel, Google Store.

Corrales previously served as chief operating officer and chief financial officer at Nest. She served as Senior Vice President of Product Operations at Cisco Systems for all Cisco-branded products. In 2006, Corrales co-founded a startup solar company, SunModular. Corrales sold the company in 2010.

Corrales serves on the board of directors for Watermark, a women's leadership organization, and is an advisor to Roli, a music technology company. Corrales supports STEM education for girls. At Cisco, she provided mentorship through programs such as Programa Escuela, which is a volunteer program for employees to teach elementary-level students about technology. Corrales is a member of the Women@Google board and an executive sponsor for HOLA, Google's Latino Employee Resource Group.

== Awards ==
- 2017, Most Powerful and Influential Women Award, National Diversity Council
- Tribute to Women Award, YWCA
- 2012, Industry Leader Award, Professional Business Women of California
