= Ana Cardoso =

Ana Cardoso can refer to:

- Ana Cardoso (actor) (1830–1878)
- Ana Cardoso (enslaved woman) (c. 1650–c. 1715)
