= Ana Casas =

Ana Casas may refer to:

- Ana Casas Broda (born 1965), Mexican photographer
- Ana María Casas (born 1955), Mexican gymnast
- Ana Teresa Casas (born 1991), Mexican cyclist
