= Ana Colomar O'Brien =

American diplomat

Ana Colomar O'Brien (born November 16, 1938) is a Cuban-born American diplomat.

The daughter of Fernando and Ana Colomar, she was born Ana Colomar in Havana and grew up in Mexico and Havana. She received a bachelor's degree from the Vedado Institute and a master's degree in English language and culture from the University of Havana. She taught English at the Vedado Institute from 1964 to 1968. She moved to New York City in 1969 and received a BA in history from Queens College, City University of New York. She was vice-president at public relations firm Mackenzie Mccheyne for eight years. In 1982, she became a special assistant at the U.S. Department of the Interior. In 1986, Colomar O'Brien became chief of protocol for the Organization of American States.
