= Ana María Tostado =

Spanish volleyball player (born 1971)

Ana María Tostado Domingo

Personal information
- Nationality: Spanish
- Born: 30 October 1971 (age 54); Valencia, Spain

Ana María Tostado (born 30 October 1971) is a Spanish former volleyball player who competed in the 1992 Summer Olympics.
