= Ana María Eizaguirre =

Spanish basketball player

Personal information
- Born: November 1, 1963 (age 63) Spain
- Listed height: 186 cm (6 ft 1 in)

Career information
- Playing career: 1982–1993
- Position: Center

Career history
- 1982-1983: Donosti
- 1983-1984: Las Banderas
- 1986-1988: Arjeriz Xuncas
- 1992-1993: Sasarte Oria

Career highlights
- 2x Spanish Cup runner-up (1987, 1988)

Ana María Eizaguirre Uranga (born 1 November 1963) is a former Spanish professional basketball player representing Spain. She played in the Spanish League with Las Banderas, Arjeriz Xuncas from Lugo and Sasarte Oria from San Sebastián. She was runner-up of two consecutive Spanish Cup finals, in 1987 and 1988.

She made her debut with Spain women's national basketball team at the age of 18. She played with the senior team for 6 years, from 1982 to 1988, with a total of 121 caps and 5.9 PPG. She participated in three European Championships:

- 5th 1981 FIBA Europe Under-18 Championship for Women (youth)
- 11th1983 Eurobasket
- 10th1985 Eurobasket
- 6th1987 Eurobasket
