= Ana Nieto Churruca =

Spanish writer and economist

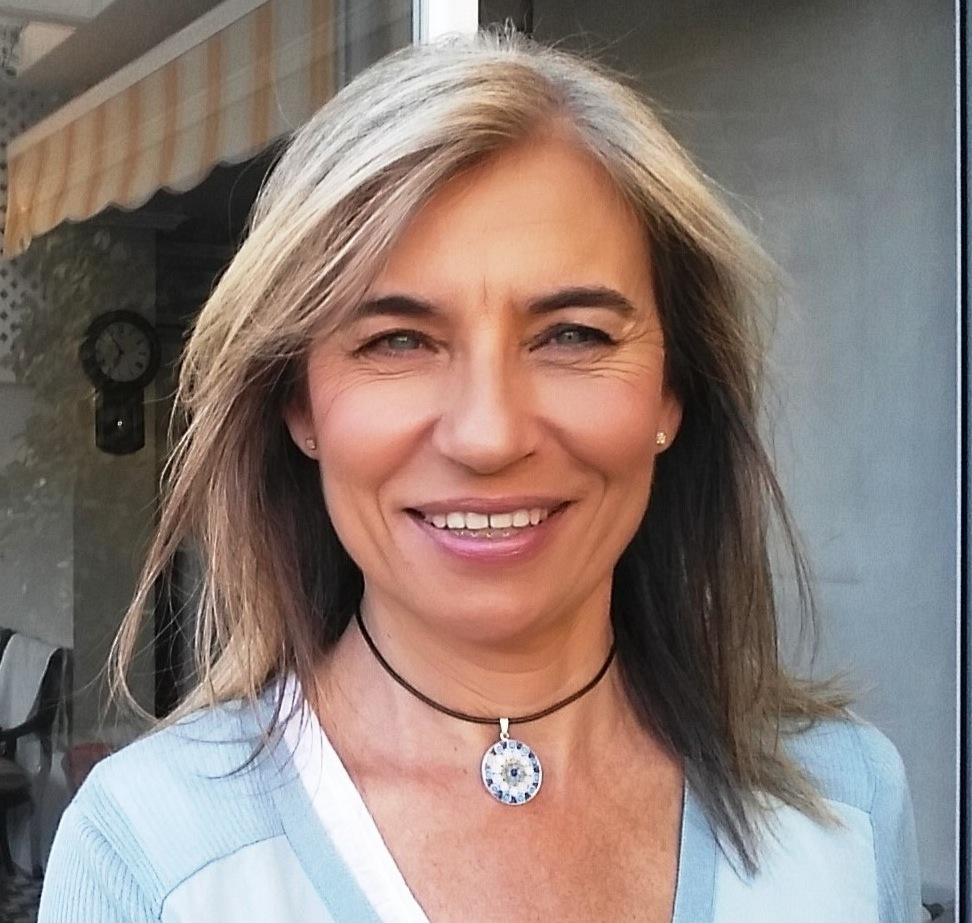
Ana Nieto Churruca

Ana Nieto Churruca (born 1961 in Bilbao), is a Spanish writer and economist, author of several books on international economics, new technologies and publishing in the digital age.

== Professional development ==
Graduated in Economic and Business Sciences (University College of Financial Studies, UCM 1984), she started working in international trade at the Spanish Embassy in Sydney (Australia). Her first book, as co-author with Olegario Llamazares was "Marketing Internacional", about international business and foreign competition.

She was marketing director at the Dutch-Hispanic Chamber of Commerce and advisor to the Spanish Institute for Foreign Trade (ICEX) on new programs and projects related to digital. She has been a professor on international trade, digital marketing and web 2.0 at Universidad Pontificia de Comillas. (ICADE), the Instituto de Empresa, the Madrid Chamber of Commerce, and in regional organisations such as Info in Murcia, Ader in La Rioja, and Ipex in Castilla La Mancha.

Since 2001 she has managed more than one hundred internet projects for companies and entrepreneurs. Nieto has developed an extensive work of dissemination of digital tools and apps through different groups and forums on Internet platforms, such as the Online Forum of Digital Marketing and the Internet Tools Group. She is one of the leaders of the digital transformation in Spain.
She is the author of essays and manuals such as "The International Web", "The 101 most useful websites", "The international marketing plan", "The complete Google+ guide: practical use for individuals and companies". "How to Make Videos by Being a Cracker in Front of the Camera" "The Writer's Kit: 50 Essential Tools".

She has studied the functionality of the different Amazon applications for editing and self-publishing and also on other digital platforms with her essay "Triunfa con tu libro" (Succeed with your ebook), that is also a digital learning platform. In "Triunfa con tu libro" she has published over a hundred interviews and podcasts with writers and digital experts as Enrique Laso, o Megan Maxwell.

== Essays ==
- Nieto Churruca, A. & Llamazares, O. (1995): Marketing Internacional Editorial Pirámide.
- Nieto Churruca, A. (2012): La web de empresa 2.0 : guía práctica para atraer visitas y conseguir clientes. Global Márketing.
- Nieto Churruca, A. (2016): Triunfa con tu ebook: Cómo escribir, publicar y vender tu libro con éxito. Kindle Amazon.
