= Ana Martinho =

Portuguese diplomat

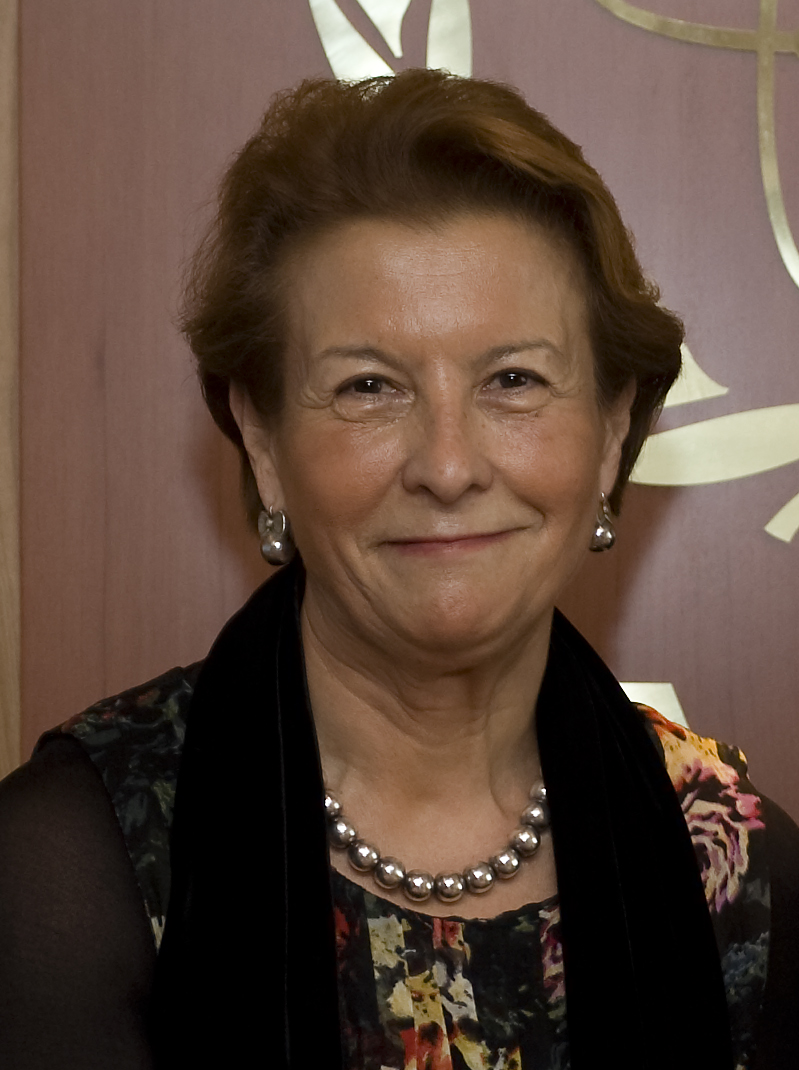
- Born: 1948; Lisbon, Portugal
- Occupation: Diplomat
- Years active: 46
- Known for: Head of Portuguese Diplomatic Service
- Awards: Prémio Femina de Honra, 2016

Ana Martinho was, until 2017, Head of the Portuguese Diplomatic Service. She was the first woman to hold this position. In 2017, she was appointed to be the advisor on International Relations to the Portuguese President.

== Career ==
Ana Martinho was born in 1948 in the Portuguese capital of Lisbon. She obtained a degree in law from the University of Lisbon in 1970 and joined the Diplomatic Service in 1975, after taking part in the first open competition to enter the Service after the Carnation Revolution of 25 April 1974, which led to the fall of the authoritarian Estado Novo regime. Between 1979 and 1986 she worked in the Permanent Mission of Portugal to the United Nations, in New York. From 1986 to 1991 she worked in the Office of the then Prime Minister, Aníbal Cavaco Silva, then moving to the Ministry of Finance, where she was Chief of Staff from 1991 to 1994. After holding increasingly important positions within Portugal's Ministry of Foreign Affairs (Ministério dos Negócios Estrangeiros) in Lisbon, she moved to Paris in 2001 as Portugal's representative to the OECD. This was followed by assignments as First Secretary in the embassy to the Czech Republic in Prague and the Office of President of the European Commission, the Portuguese, José Manuel Barroso, in Brussels from 2005 to 2009. In 2009 she moved to Vienna to be Permanent Representative of Portugal to the Organization for Security and Co-operation in Europe (OSCE). In 2012 she also took on the role of Portuguese Ambassador to Austria.

In March 2013, Martinho was promoted to be Secretary-General of the Ministry of Foreign Affairs. She stayed in this role until October 2017, when she joined the Office of the President of the Republic, Marcelo Rebelo de Sousa, as his advisor on International Relations.

== Awards and honours ==
- Martinho was awarded the Prémio Femina de Honra award in 2016. This is an annual award given since 2010 to distinguished Portuguese and Lusophone women.

== Personal life ==
Martinho is married, with two children.
