= Ana Marinovic =

Basketball player

Ana Reed (née Marinovic)
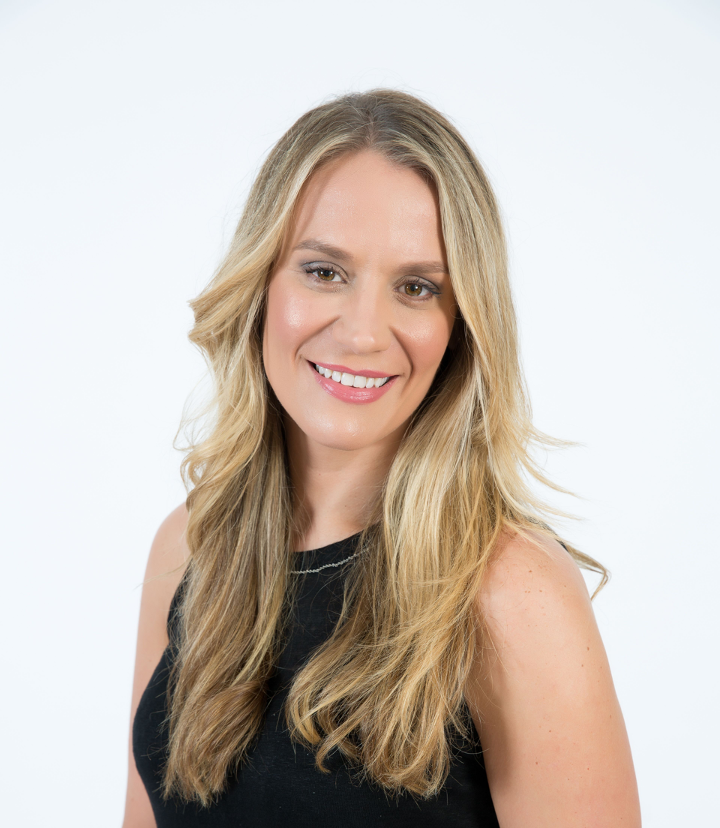
- Ana Roslie Reed (née Marinovic)
- Born: 9 July 1980 (age 46); Geelong, Australia
- Occupations: Founder & CEO Newmanity®
- Years active: 2003–present
- Website: anarosereed.com//

Ana Reed (born Ana Marinovic, 1980 in Geelong, Australia) is CEO of Newmanity® and former Croatian professional women's basketball player and businesswoman. She played the power forward position for women-division clubs in Croatia and Australia.

== Professional career ==
=== Newmanity ===
In 2020, Ana Reed founded Newmanity®, a leadership consultancy dedicated to making organizations more human-centric. The company brings together psychologists, artists, entrepreneurs, and practitioners to support this mission.

=== Women of Inspiration ===
In 2017, she was the host of the first Women of Inspiration event in Maui. Attendees included female global CEOs and celebrities from the UK, Silicon Valley and China including Maggie Cheng, Secretary General of the China Entrepreneur Club.

=== Basketball career ===
A centre and power forward player, Reed (née: Marinovic) played a season for Zadar in the Croatian A1 women's league and 5 seasons in the Big V women's league in Australia. In 2010, Reed was selected in the Big V All Star 5. In 2002, 2003, she was selected for the Australian University Team

Reed was President & Founder of Love Guinea Basketball. The program was given an official mandate by the Government of Guinea in July 2013 to stabilize the effect on in-country violence, and enhance opportunities for economic and social prosperity. The program helped the Guinea Women's basketball team progress within the FIBA ranks.
