= Ana Teresa Pereira =

Portuguese novelist

Ana Teresa Pereira (born 1958) is a Portuguese novelist.

She was born in Funchal. She published her debut novel, Matar a Imagem (Killing the Image), in 1989. She has written more than 20 books.
