= Mozambique Workers' Organization =

OTM
- Mozanbique Workers' Organization
- Organização dos Trabalhadores de Moçambique
- Founded: 1983
- Headquarters: Maputo, Mozambique
- Location: Mozambique
- Members: 250,000
- Key people: Alexandre Munguambe, secretary general
- Affiliations: ITUC
- Website: www.otm.org.mz

The Mozambique Workers' Organization (Organização dos Trabalhadores de Moçambique) (OTM) is a national trade union center in Mozambique.

The OTM was formed in 1983 as a directly controlled arm of the Frelimo political party. However, in 1990 the OTM declared its independence from the party, although critics maintain that it is still close.
