= Ana Lilia Garza Cadena =

Mexican politician (born 1970)

Deputy of Mexico
- In office 2013
- Constituency: Baja California

Personal details
- Born: 9 April 1970 (age 56) Monterrey, Nuevo León, Mexico
- Party: PVEM

Ana Lilia Garza Cadena (born 9 April 1970) is a Mexican politician affiliated with the PVEM. As of 2013 she served as Deputy of the LXII Legislature of the Mexican Congress representing Baja California.
