= List of fellows of the American Academy in Rome (1971–1990) =

List of fellows of the American Academy in Rome is a list of those who have been awarded the Rome Prize.

The Rome Prize is a prestigious American award made annually by the American Academy in Rome, through a national competition, to 15 emerging artists (working in Architecture, Landscape architecture, Design, Historic Preservation and Conservation, Literature, Musical composition, or Visual arts) and to 15 scholars (working in Ancient, Medieval, Renaissance and early Modern, or Modern Italian Studies).

List of fellows of the American Academy in Rome
1896–1970	1971–1990	1991–2010	2011–present

== Fellows of the American Academy in Rome ==
=== 1971 ===
Year	Category	Winner
1971	Architecture	Gregory S. Baldwin
1971	Classical studies & archaeology	Joseph C. Carter
1971	Classical studies & archaeology	J. Rufus Fears
1971	Architecture	Michael Guran
1971	Visual arts	Philip Guston
1971	Classical studies & archaeology	John Arthur Hanson
1971	Architecture	David J. Jacob
1971	Design	June Meyer Jordan
1971	Classical studies & archaeology	Dawson Kiang
1971	Post-classical humanistic studies	Benjamin G. Kohl
1971	Musical composition	Barbara Kolb
1971	Visual arts	Kenneth Richard Lithgowy
1971	Post-classical humanistic studies	John Monfasani
1971	Architecture	William Leonard Pereira
1971	Visual arts	Charles O. Perry
1971	Landscape architecture	Peter M. Pollack
1971	Musical composition	Loren Rush
1971	History of art	Susan Saward
1971	Musical composition	Harold S. Shapero
1971	History of art	Cecil L. Striker
1971	Musical composition	Richard Aaker Trythall

=== 1972 ===
1972	Architecture	Richard Bartholomew
1972	Post-classical humanistic studies	Denis J.M. Bradley
1972	Classical studies & archaeology	John H. D'Arms
1972	Musical composition	David Diamond
1972	Classical studies & archaeology	Margaret H. DuBois
1972	Design	Robert Regis Dvorak
1972	Visual arts	Alan Feltus
1972	Musical composition	James Heinke
1972	Classical studies & archaeology	Richard J. Hoffman
1972	Visual arts	Luise Kaish
1972	History of art	Dale Kinney
1972	Design	Robert Kramer
1972	History of art	Irving Lavin
1972	Classical studies & archaeology	Milton E. Lord
1972	Post-classical humanistic studies	Janet M. Martin
1972	Visual arts	John Matt
1972	Visual arts	Costantino Nivola
1972	Musical composition	Daniel Perlongo
1972	Visual arts	Gregorio Prestopino
1972	Landscape architecture	Charles A. Rapp
1972	Visual arts	Jesse Reichek
1972	Architecture	Peter Miller Schmitt
1972	History of art	Peter Selz
1972	Visual arts	Robert Strini
1972	Visual arts	John Wenger

=== 1973 ===
1973	Classical studies & archaeology	Harry B. Evans
1973	Architecture	Robert Ward Evans
1973	History of art	Philipp Fehl
1973	Classical studies & archaeology	Karl Galinsky
1973	Classical studies & archaeology	Gretchen Kromer
1973	Architecture	Grover E. Mouton
1973	Musical composition	Eugene O'Brien
1973	Classical studies & archaeology	David G. Orr
1973	Visual arts	David S. Shapiro
1973	History of art	Innis H. Shoemaker
1973	Musical composition	Leo Smit
1973	Visual arts	Jack Tworkov
1973	Architecture	Harry W. Weese

=== 1974 ===
1974	Design	Joseph H. Aronson
1974	Design	Robert W. Braunschweiger
1974	Architecture	Brand Norman Griffin
1974	Classical studies & archaeology	David D. Grose
1974	Visual arts	Dimitri Hadzi
1974	Visual arts	Robert G. Hamilton
1974	History of art	Anne Coffin Hanson
1974	Musical composition	William Hellermann
1974	History of art	William E. Hood
1974	Visual arts	Michael Scott Hrabak
1974	Musical composition	Jeffrey Jones
1974	Musical composition	Leon Kirchner
1974	Architecture	Richard Meier
1974	Landscape architecture	Laurie D. Olin
1974	Musical composition	Tison Street
1974	Post-classical humanistic studies	Gordon Tonner
1974	Classical studies & archaeology	John W. Vaughn
1974	Architecture	Thomas R. Vreeland
1974	Visual arts	Thomas Walsh
1974	Visual arts	Sharon D. Yates

=== 1975 ===
1975	Design	Donald Appleyard
1975	Architecture	Marc Balet
1975	Musical composition	David Snow Bates
1975	Landscape architecture	Richard C. Bell
1975	Post-classical humanistic studies	James E. Bullard
1975	Visual arts	Maria Burgaleta
1975	Architecture	Jean Paul Carlhian
1975	Design	Stephen Carr
1975	Visual arts	Aldo J. Casanova
1975	Visual arts	Stephen Daly
1975	Musical composition	John C. Eaton
1975	Musical composition	George Edwards
1975	Classical studies & archaeology	James L. Franklin
1975	Visual arts	Frank B. Holmes
1975	Architecture	Franklin D. Israel
1975	Literature	Alfred Kazin
1975	Visual arts	György Kepes
1975	Classical studies & archaeology	Gerhard M. Koeppel
1975	Architecture	Robert S. Livesey
1975	Architecture	Charles W. Moore
1975	Classical studies & archaeology	Steven E. Ostrow
1975	History of art	John Pinto
1975	Post-classical humanistic studies	Eugene F. Rice
1975	Visual arts	Daniel Snyder

=== 1976 ===
1976	William Bailey
1976	Visual arts	Wulf Barsch
1976	Architecture	Gunnar Birkerts
1976	History of art	Kathleen Weil-Garris Brandt
1976	Musical composition	Martin Bresnick
1976	Architecture	Marvin Buchanan
1976	Architecture	Peter Carl
1976	History of art	Michael Conforti (art historian)
1976	Post-classical humanistic studies	John Francis D'Amico
1976	Landscape architecture	Stuart O. Dawson
1976	Design	Robert De Fuccio
1976	Visual arts	Robert G. Dodge
1976	Classical studies & archaeology	Bernard D. Frischer
1976	Classical studies & archaeology	Judith R. Ginsburg
1976	Landscape architecture	Robert Mitchell Hanna
1976	Visual arts	Bunny Harvey
1976	Design	Robert Jensen
1976	Architecture	John M. Johansen
1976	Landscape architecture	Daniel Urban Kiley
1976	Musical composition	Barbara Kolb
1976	Architecture	Peter Kommers
1976	Classical studies & archaeology	Anne Laidlaw
1976	Visual arts	Steven A. Linn
1976	Visual arts	Conrad Marca-Relli
1976	Architecture	Arthur May
1976	History of art	Amy Neff
1976	Post-classical humanistic studies	Duane J. Osheim
1976	Musical composition	Gerald H. Plain
1976	History of art	Leo Steinberg
1976	Landscape architecture	Leonard Azeo Torre
1976	Landscape architecture	James R. Turner

=== 1977 ===
1977	Musical composition	Chester Biscardi
1977	Post-classical humanistic studies	Anthony Cardoza
1977	Architecture	Judith Chafee
1977	Classical studies & archaeology	Willson W. Cummer
1977	History of art	Jack Freiberg
1977	Classical studies & archaeology	David M. Halperin
1977	Design	Peter Hoppner
1977	Classical studies & archaeology	John F. Kenfield, III
1977	Design	George Krause
1977	Architecture	Diane Lewis
1977	Architecture	Robert Mangurian
1977	Architecture	Vincent Mulcahy
1977	Visual arts	Gabor F. Peterdi
1977	Classical studies & archaeology	Kyle Phillips
1977	Classical studies & archaeology	Jeffrey A. Schiff
1977	Post-classical humanistic studies	Earl G. Schreiber
1977	Design	Paul D. Schwartzman
1977	History of art	Virginia Bush Suttman
1977	Post-classical humanistic studies	Charles Trinkaus
1977	Design	James Velleco
1977	Post-classical humanistic studies	Pauline Moffitt Watts
1977	Literature	Miller Williams

=== 1978 ===
1978	History of art	Rudolf Arnheim
1978	Design	Gordon C. Baldwin
1978	Architecture	Herbert Bayer
1978	Musical composition	Robert Beaser
1978	Post-classical humanistic studies	Victoria De Grazia
1978	Architecture	Judith Di Maio
1978	Visual arts	Simon Dinnerstein
1978	Literature	Daniel Mark Epstein
1978	Musical composition	Lukas Fosse
1978	Post-classical humanistic studies	Paul F. Gehl
1978	Classical studies & archaeology	Catherine Spotswood Gibbes
1978	Architecture	Romaldo Giurgola (R)
1978	Architecture	Michael Graves
1978	Classical studies & archaeology	Anne Haeckl
1978	Design	George E. Hartman
1978	Design	Michael Lax
1978	History of art	David A. Levine
1978	Architecture	Donlyn Lyndon
1978	Post-classical humanistic studies	Frederick J. McGinness
1978	Design	Donald Peting
1978	Post-classical humanistic studies	Cynthia Pyle
1978	Classical studies & archaeology	Lawrence Richardson
1978	Landscape architecture	Peter G. Rolland
1978	Post-classical humanistic studies	Alice Levine Rubinstein
1978	Classical studies & archaeology	Gareth Schmeling
1978	History of art	Ellen Shapiro
1978	Visual arts	Judith Silver
1978	Design	Alison Sky
1978	Classical studies & archaeology	Philip O. Spann
1978	Design	Michelle Stone
1978	Musical composition	John H. Thow
1978	Classical studies & archaeology	Susan E. Wood

=== 1979 ===
1979	Musical composition	William Albright
1979	Classical studies & archaeology	James C. Anderson
1979	History of art	Jeffrey Blanchard
1979	History of art	Virginia Anne Bonito
1979	Classical studies & archaeology	Robert Brentano
1979	Visual arts	Caren Canier
1979	Classical studies & archaeology	Glenn Chesnut
1979	Architecture	Caroline B. Constant
1979	Visual arts	Joseph Draegert
1979	Visual arts	Charles Dwyer
1979	Musical composition	Dennis Eberhard
1979	History of art	Gail Feigenbaum
1979	Post-classical humanistic studies	Richard Ferraro
1979	Visual arts	Nancy S. Graves
1979	Landscape architecture	Edgar C. Haag
1979	Classical studies & archaeology	William V. Harris
1979	Landscape architecture	Stephen C. Haus
1979	Visual arts	Robert Hooper
1979	Classical studies & archaeology	E. Christian Kopff
1979	Visual arts	Paul Kubic
1979	Architecture	Esther Lambeth
1979	Architecture	James L. Lambeth
1979	Visual arts	John L. Massey
1979	Literature	Mary McCarthy
1979	History of art	Michael P. Mezzatesta
1979	History of art	Jeffrey Muller
1979	Post-classical humanistic studies	Ronald G. Musto
1979	Classical studies & archaeology	Robert E. A. Palmer
1979	Literature	John F. Peck
1979	Visual arts	Lewis Rakosky
1979	Classical studies & archaeology	Emeline Richardson
1979	Classical studies & archaeology	Russell T. Scott
1979	Musical composition	Sheila Silver
1979	Architecture	James S. Stokoe
1979	History of art	William L. Tronzo
1979	Post-classical humanistic studies	Rebecca J. West

=== 1980 ===
1980	History of art	James S. Ackerman
1980	History of art	Joseph D. Alchermes
1980	Design	Morley Baer
1980	Architecture	Richard Bender
1980	History of art	Robert Bergman
1980	Architecture	James L. Bodnar
1980	Post-classical humanistic studies	Albert Boime
1980	Architecture	Andrea Clark Brown
1980	Classical studies & archaeology	Paul F. Burke
1980	Literature	Joseph K. Caldwell
1980	Visual arts	Michael J. Cooper
1980	Design	Rusty Culp
1980	Design	Andrea O. Dean
1980	Post-classical humanistic studies	Arthur M. Field
1980	Visual arts	Stephen Geldman
1980	Visual arts	Cleve Gray
1980	Literature	Francine du Plessix Gray
1980	History of art	Barbara A. Kellum
1980	Design	George Krause
1980	Musical composition	Arthur V. Kreiger
1980	History of art	Ramsay MacMullen
1980	Visual arts	Leo Manso
1980	Post-classical humanistic studies	Nelson H. Minnich
1980	Classical studies & archaeology	Christopher Moss
1980	Visual arts	Gwynn Murrill
1980	Visual arts	Laura M. Newman
1980	Classical studies & archaeology	Helen F. North
1980	History of art	Catherine R. Puglisi
1980	Architecture	Patrick J. Quinn
1980	Musical composition	Allen R. Shearer
1980	Post-classical humanistic studies	Daniel J. Sheerin
1980	Visual arts	Donald C. Shields
1980	Musical composition	William O. Smith
1980	Architecture	Thomas G. Smith
1980	Architecture	Stanley A. Tigerman
1980	Architecture	William Turnbull
1980	Landscape architecture	E. Michael Vergason
1980	Classical studies & archaeology	Anne Weis

=== 1981 ===
1981	Architecture	Amy Anderson
1981	Architecture	Thomas L. Bosworth
1981	Literature	Joseph Brodsky
1981	Classical studies & archaeology	Robert H. Drews
1981	Post-classical humanistic studies	Richard Etlin
1981	Classical studies & archaeology	Linda W. Rutland Gillison
1981	Musical composition	John Harbison
1981	Visual arts	Al Held
1981	Musical composition	Stephen Jaffe
1981	Architecture	Euine Fay Jones
1981	Architecture	Spence Kass
1981	Architecture	Stephen J. Kieran (KieranTimberlake)
1981	Architecture	John Q. Lawson
1981	Musical composition	John Anthony Lennon
1981	Musical composition	Robert Hall Lewis
1981	Visual arts	Philip R. Livingston
1981	Post-classical humanistic studies	Janet Blow Long
1981	Classical studies & archaeology	Michael Maas
1981	Classical studies & archaeology	Susan D. Martin
1981	Visual arts	Melissa Meyer
1981	Literature	Mary Morris
1981	Visual arts	Carlton Newton
1981	Post-classical humanistic studies	Laurie Nussdorfer
1981	Visual arts	Reeva Potoff
1981	History of art	Eileen Roberts
1981	History of art	John Beldon Scott
1981	Architecture	Werner Seligmann
1981	Classical studies & archaeology	Rose Mary Sheldon
1981	Visual arts	Rochelle Shicoff
1981	Classical studies & archaeology	Joseph Solodow
1981	Visual arts	Sylvia Stonel
1981	History of art	Deborah Stott
1981	Landscape architecture	John L. Wong
1981	Post-classical humanistic studies	Jan Ziolkowski

=== 1982 ===
1982	History of art	Susan J. Barnes
1982	Classical studies & archaeology	Bettina Ann Bergmann
1982	Musical composition	Todd Brief
1982	Landscape architecture	Richard Burck
1982	History of art	Sharon Cather
1982	Classical studies & archaeology	Jane W. Crawford
1982	Classical studies & archaeology	Jean M. Davison
1982	Musical composition	Jacob Druckman
1982	Literature	Edward Field
1982	History of art	Eric M. Frank
1982	Post-classical humanistic studies	James Hankins
1982	History of art	J. Richard Judson
1982	Architecture	Robert Kahn
1982	Visual arts	Pamela Keech
1982	Visual arts	David LaPalombara
1982	Literature	Frank MacShane
1982	Post-classical humanistic studies	James McGregor
1982	Architecture	William G. McMinn
1982	Architecture	D. Blake Middleton
1982	Visual arts	James Muehlemann
1982	Visual arts	Philip Pearlstein
1982	Post-classical humanistic studies	Ingrid Rowland
1982	Post-classical humanistic studies	Gerald Silk
1982	Post-classical humanistic studies	Sarah Spence
1982	Visual arts	Earl V. Staley
1982	Design	Paul L. Steinberg
1982	Musical composition	Nicholas Thorne
1982	Architecture	Fred Travisano
1982	Classical studies & archaeology	Roger B. Ulrich
1982	Architecture	Craig H. Walton
1982	Design	Emily M. Whiteside
1982	Design	Randolph A. Williams

=== 1983 ===
1983	Design	Stanley Abercrombie
1983	History of art	Elizabeth Bartman
1983	Musical composition	Larry Thomas Bell
1983	Classical studies & archaeology	John Bodel
1983	Post-classical humanistic studies	Thomas Cerbu
1983	History of art	Nicola Courtright
1983	History of art	Bernice F. Davidson
1983	Literature	Mark Helprin
1983	Visual arts	George Herms
1983	Classical studies & archaeology	Roger A. Hornsby
1983	Classical studies & archaeology	Eric Hostetter
1983	Landscape architecture	J. B. Jackson
1983	Architecture	Eugene Kupper
1983	Musical composition	Ezra Laderman
1983	Architecture	Gary Larson
1983	Visual arts	Pat Lasch
1983	Architecture	Celia Ledbetter
1983	Post-classical humanistic studies	David R. Marsh
1983	Architecture	John J. McDonald
1983	Classical studies & archaeology	John McManamon
1983	Classical studies & archaeology	Glenn W. Most
1983	Musical composition	William Neil
1983	History of art	Charlotte Nichols
1983	History of art	Maria A. Phillips
1983	Visual arts	Edward W. Schmidt
1983	Architecture	Barbara Stauffacher Solomon
1983	Visual arts	Frank Stella
1983	Architecture	James Stirling
1983	Literature	Mark Strand
1983	Landscape architecture	Jack Sullivan
1983	Visual arts	Warren Saul Tanner
1983	Architecture	James Timberlake (KieranTimberlake)
1983	Classical studies & archaeology	Ann Vasaly
1983	Design	Tod Williams

=== 1984 ===
1984	Architecture	Anthony Ames
1984	History of art	Larry M. Ayres
1984	History of art	Mirka Benes
1984	Design	Anna Campbell Bliss
1984	Design	Turner Brooks
1984	Post-classical humanistic studies	Melissa Meriam Bullard
1984	Visual arts	Jo Anne Carson
1984	Design	Adele Chatfield-Taylor
1984	Visual arts	Dennis E. Congdon
1984	Classical studies & archaeology	John H. D'Arms
1984	Musical composition	Tamar Diesendruck
1984	Classical studies & archaeology	Ingrid E.M. Edlund-Berry
1984	Architecture	Mark M. Foster
1984	Landscape architecture	M. Paul Friedberg
1984	Musical composition	Jay Anthony Gach
1984	Literature	Nadine Gordimer
1984	Architecture	Alexander C. Gorlin
1984	Classical studies & archaeology	Thomas Groves
1984	Visual arts	Christian Haub
1984	Architecture	George A. Hinds
1984	History of art	Susan G. Hunt
1984	History of art	Christopher M.S. Johns
1984	Architecture	Wendy Evans Joseph
1984	Architecture	Gerhard M. Kallmann
1984	Visual arts	Alex Katz
1984	Classical studies & archaeology	Laetitia La Follette
1984	Classical studies & archaeology	Eleanor Winsor Leach
1984	Post-classical humanistic studies	Robert Lerner
1984	Visual arts	Ana Maria Mendieta
1984	History of art	Derek A. R. Moore
1984	Landscape architecture	Stacy T. Moriarty
1984	Post-classical humanistic studies	John W. O'Malley
1984	History of art	Gary M. Radke
1984	History of art	Olga Raggio
1984	Literature	Gjertrud Schnackenberg
1984	Post-classical humanistic studies	Carolyn Springer
1984	Classical studies & archaeology	Gregory Staley
1984	Post-classical humanistic studies	Pamela F. Starr
1984	History of art	Hellmut Wohl

=== 1985 ===
1985	Visual arts	Nicholas Blosser
1985	History of art	Anthony Colantuono
1985	Architecture	Alan Colquhoun
1985	Visual arts	Houston Conwill
1985	Literature	Clark Coolidge
1985	Design	Morison S. Cousins
1985	Architecture	Roger Crowley
1985	Architecture	Joseph De Pace
1985	Musical composition	David Del Tredici
1985	Visual arts	Andrew Forge
1985	Post-classical humanistic studies	Carmela Vircillo Franklin
1985	History of art	David M. Gillerman
1985	Visual arts	Frank Gillette
1985	Post-classical humanistic studies	Beverly L. Kahn
1985	Musical composition	Aaron Jay Kernis
1985	History of art	Herbert L. Kessler
1985	Classical studies & archaeology	Georg Nicolaus Knauer
1985	Visual arts	Benedict La Rico
1985	Classical studies & archaeology	Thomas McGinn
1985	History of art	John E. Moore
1985	Musical composition	Paul Moravec
1985	Architecture	John Naughton
1985	History of art	Loren W. Partridge
1985	Visual arts	Marsha Pels
1985	Classical studies & archaeology	J. Theodore Pena
1985	Design	Antoine S. Predock
1985	Architecture	Jesse Reiser
1985	Architecture	Frederic D. Schwartz
1985	Classical studies & archaeology	George A. Sheets
1985	Design	Friedrich St. Florian
1985	Literature	David St. John
1985	Landscape architecture	Chip Sullivan
1985	Design	Edward Marc Treib
1985	Classical studies & archaeology	Rex E. Wallace

=== 1986 ===
1986	History of art	Caroline A. Bruzelius
1986	Visual arts	Brit Bunkley
1986	Design	John J. Casbarian
1986	Classical studies & archaeology	Eve D'Ambra
1986	Landscape architecture	Joanna Dougherty
1986	Architecture	James Favaro
1986	Classical studies & archaeology	Marleen Flory
1986	History of art	Dorothy F. Glass
1986	Literature	Oscar Hijuelos
1986	Design	Elizabeth Humstone
1986	Design	Allan B. Jacobs
1986	Architecture	Wes Jones
1986	Post-classical humanistic studies	Thomas Forrest Kelly
1986	Architecture	Leon Krier
1986	Architecture	Roy W. Lewis
1986	Musical composition	Scott Lindroth
1986	Visual arts	Lizbeth Marano
1986	Post-classical humanistic studies	Robert Moynihan
1986	Classical studies & archaeology	Helen Nagy
1986	Visual arts	Franc Palaia
1986	Classical studies & archaeology	Carole Paul
1986	Visual arts	Curtis Bill Pepper
1986	Visual arts	Beverly Pepper
1986	Design	William L. Plumb
1986	Post-classical humanistic studies	Charles M. Radding
1986	History of art	Louise Rice
1986	Architecture	Danny M. Samuels
1986	History of art	Melinda Schlitt
1986	Classical studies & archaeology	Charles P. Segal
1986	Visual arts	Philip Lawrence Sherrod
1986	History of art	Leo Steinberg
1986	Design	Jorge Silvetti
1986	Visual arts	Charles Simonds
1986	Musical composition	Rand Steiger
1986	Architecture	Robert H. Timme
1986	Classical studies & archaeology	Joseph Walsh
1986	History of art	Mark S. Weil

=== 1987 ===
1987	Visual arts	Vito Acconci
1987	Classical studies & archaeology	Charles L. Babcock
1987	Architecture	Frederick Biehle
1987	Musical composition	Earle Brown
1987	Architecture	William Bruder
1987	History of art	Joseph Connors
1987	Architecture	Kathryn Dean
1987	History of art	Isabelle Frank
1987	History of art	Margaret Frazer
1987	Classical studies & archaeology	Alfred Frazer
1987	Design	Jeanne Giordano
1987	Classical studies & archaeology	Kathryn L. Gleason
1987	History of art	Samuel D. Gruber
1987	Visual arts	Alan Gussow
1987	Landscape architecture	Elizabeth Dean Hermann
1987	Post-classical humanistic studies	Gary John Ianziti
1987	Classical studies & archaeology	Laurence H. Kant
1987	Literature	Richard Kenney
1987	Literature	Galway Kinnell
1987	Design	Norman Krumholz
1987	Visual arts	Barry Ledoux
1987	Musical composition	Thomas Oboe Lee
1987	Post-classical humanistic studies	Mark Lilla
1987	Visual arts	Bruce Nauman
1987	Design	Julie Riefler
1987	History of art	Donna Salzer
1987	Classical studies & archaeology	Michele Renee Salzman
1987	Visual arts	Margo Sawyer
1987	Visual arts	Wendy Sussman
1987	Visual arts	Joan Thorne
1987	History of art	Joanna Woods-Marsden

=== 1988 ===
1988	History of art	Nicholas Adams
1988	Musical composition	John Adams
1988	Classical studies & archaeology	Albert Ammerman
1988	Post-classical humanistic studies	Martha Baldwin
1988	Classical studies & archaeology	T. Corey Brennan
1988	Architecture	Theodore L. Brown
1988	History of art	Maria Ann Conelli
1988	Classical studies & archaeology	John Francis D'Amico
1988	Design	Joseph Paul D'Urso
1988	History of art	Diane Ghirardo
1988	Post-classical humanistic studies	Katherine Gill
1988	Visual arts	Mark Greenwold
1988	Musical composition	Kamran Ince
1988	Musical composition	Fred Lerdahl
1988	Classical studies & archaeology	William Levitan
1988	Classical studies & archaeology	Michael Lax
1988	History of art	David A. Levine
1988	Architecture	Margaret Miles
1988	Post-classical humanistic studies	Kathy Muehlemann
1988	Classical studies & archaeology	Christopher Parslow
1988	Visual arts	Judy Pfaff
1988	Architecture	Elizabeth Plater-Zyberk
1988	Visual arts	Gordon POwell
1988	Literature	Padgett Powell
1988	Post-classical humanistic studies	Pike Powers
1988	Architecture	George L. Queral
1988	Post-classical humanistic studies	Diana Robin
1988	Musical composition	Steve Rouse
1988	History of art	Richard E. Spear
1988	Classical studies & archaeology	Joanne Spurza
1988	Landscape architecture	Daniel Tuttle
1988	Landscape architecture	Michael R. Van Valkenburgh

=== 1989 ===
1989	Musical composition	Kathryn Alexander
1989	Post-classical humanistic studies	David Anderson
1989	Classical studies & archaeology	Larry Ball
1989	Design	Ellen Beasley
1989	Classical studies & archaeology	Malcolm Bell
1989	History of art	Caroline A. Bruzelius
1989	Classical studies & archaeology	Howard Crosby
1989	Design	Walter Chatham
1989	Landscape architecture	Linda J. Cook
1989	Visual arts	Susan Crile
1989	Design	Phoebe Cutler
1989	Post-classical humanistic studies	Pellegrino D'Acierno
1989	Architecture	Douglas Darden
1989	Musical composition	Michelle Ekizian
1989	History of art	David Hodes Friedman
1989	History of art	Catherine Fruhan
1989	Classical studies & archaeology	James Higginbotham
1989	Literature	Edward Hirsch
1989	Classical studies & archaeology	Michael H. Jameson
1989	History of art	Alice Jarrard
1989	Visual arts	Bill Jensen
1989	Classical studies & archaeology	Cynthia Kahn-White
1989	Classical studies & archaeology	Ernst Kitzinger
1989	Visual arts	Roy Lichtenstein
1989	Classical studies & archaeology	Martha A. Malamud
1989	Architecture	David Mayernik
1989	Design	Debra McCall
1989	Architecture	Noel Michael McKinnell
1989	Visual arts	Mary Miss
1989	Visual arts	John Obuck
1989	Architecture	Thomas Silva
1989	Visual arts	Shelly Simpson
1989	Musical composition	Harvey Sollberger
1989	Visual arts	Patrick Strzelec
1989	Visual arts	Carol Szymanski
1989	Classical studies & archaeology	Paul Zanker

=== 1990 ===
1990	Architecture	Thomas Agnotti
1990	Design	Ross S. Anderson
1990	Landscape architecture	Julie Bargmann
1990	Classical studies & archaeology	Barbara Barletta
1990	History of art	Patricia Fortini Brown
1990	Classical studies & archaeology	Andrew Feldherr
1990	Classical studies & archaeology	Erich S. Gruen
1990	Visual arts	David Hammons
1990	History of art	Francis Haskell
1990	Design	Miller Horns
1990	Classical studies & archaeology	Sheree A. Jaros
1990	Post-classical humanistic studies	Daniel Javitch
1990	History of art	Susan Klaiber
1990	Post-classical humanistic studies	Deeana Copeland Klepper
1990	Architecture	Grace R. Kobayashi
1990	History of art	Margaret A. Kuntz
1990	History of art	Evonne Levy
1990	Visual arts	Ann McCoy
1990	History of art	Sheila McTighe
1990	Musical composition	James Mobberley
1990	Classical studies & archaeology	Anna M. Moore
1990	Landscape architecture	Laurie D. Olin
1990	Literature	Robert G. Shacochis
1990	Classical studies & archaeology	Noel M. Swerdlow
1990	Classical studies & archaeology	William Nelson Turpin
1990	Architecture	William K. Vinyard
1990	Musical composition	Walter K. Winslow
1990	Visual arts	David Winter
1990	History of art	Stephan S. Wolohojian
1990	Visual arts	Christopher Wool
1990	Musical composition	Ellen Taaffe Zwilich
