= Frank Baker Holmes =

American painter

Frank Baker Holmes is an American painter.

== Background and education ==
Born December 20, 1938 in Detroit, Michigan, Holmes received his Bachelor's degree from Pratt Institute, Brooklyn, New York in 1962, and his Master of Fine Arts in 1972, from Ohio University, Athens, Ohio.

Since 1985, Holmes has lived in Narrowsburg, NY, with his wife, painter Jill Mackie.

== Awards ==
In 1973, while working towards his MFA in Ohio, Holmes received the Rome Prize after submitting his paintings, some of which made dynamic use of three point perspective in meticulously detailed interior settings. He spent two years painting in Rome Italy, alongside other Academy members Laurie Olin, Mark Balet, Dan Snyder, and Franklin D. Israel. In 1975 he became a Fellow of the American Academy in Rome in painting. In 1977, Holmes also received the Ingram Merrill Foundation Fellowship.

== Works ==
A number of Holmes’s paintings have been classified as hyperrealism. A practiced enigmatist, he has created at least four distinct bodies of work, each exploring a different method of depicting reality. In 1996, James F. Cooper wrote in American Arts Quarterly, of Holmes’s solo exhibition in New York City: “Playful, mysterious, complex, soulful, these latest paintings, evoke associations, with the formal interiors of Vermeer and surrealist iconography of de Chirico and Magritte”, and, “with honest painting that is so imaginative and creative, so passionate, about color, form, and objects that fascinate him, that he never settles for the mundane, or the politically correct observation.”

In addition to his 13 solo exhibitions Holmes’s work has been included in group exhibitions at the National Academy of Sciences, Washington, DC, the Grand Palais, Paris, France, Portland Oregon Museum of Art, Portland, Oregon, The Joslyn Museum, Omaha, Nebraska, The Butler Institute of American Art, Youngstown, Ohio, The Newport Harbor Museum, Newport, Beach, California, The Heckscher Museum, Huntington, New York, and the Sherry French Gallery, New York City.

Holmes’s work is in the public and private collections of Roberson Museum, Binghamton, New York, Dayton Art Institute, Dayton, Ohio, American Express International, New York; Owens-Corning Fiberglass, Toledo, Ohio, Capricorn Gallery, Bethesda, Maryland and Mr. Elton John, London, England.

Holmes has been represented by the Zenith Gallery, Washington DC, Dassin Gallery, Los Angeles, California, Partners Gallery, Bethesda, Maryland, TLK Gallery, Costa Mesa, California and in New York City by Monique Knowlton Gallery, Galerie Tamenaga, and Sindin Galleries.

== Press ==
In addition to the cited interviews by James F. Cooper, Gerrit Henry and John Russell, Allen Ellenzweig, Carter Ratcliff, Jenny Pfalzgraf, Ruth Bass and Nina French-Frazier, among others, have also written of Holmes’s work appearing in, ARTnews, Arts Magazine, The Artist's Magazine, American Art Review, The New York Times, and The Los Angeles Times.

== Notable commissions ==
- "The Sarcophagus"
- The Ohio Theater Project
- "The Conch Shell"

== Photography ==
In 1975, Holmes joined a group led by classicist Frank Brown to ascend the Pantheon roof in Rome Italy so they could look into the oculus. Holmes's photos from that day have been credited in a number of books and websites.

== See also ==
- List of fellows of the American Academy in Rome (1971–1990)
