= Dan Snyder (artist) =

American artist (born 1948)

- Born: Daniel Cotton Snyder; July 23, 1948 (age 78); Philadelphia, Pennsylvania, United States
- Education: Pennsylvania State University, University of California, Davis
- Occupations: Sculptor, ceramicist, educator.

Daniel Cotton Snyder (born 1948) is an American sculptor, ceramicist, and educator. He lives in Berkeley, California.

== Background and education ==
Born July 23, 1948 in Philadelphia, Pennsylvania. Initially Snyder was inspired by his Central High School art instructor Frederick Gill. Opting not to go to art school in order to follow his brother Allan Snyder’s scientific career path, he nonetheless found his calling while holding a ball of clay in a ceramics class, and earned bachelor of fine arts degree from Pennsylvania State University 1970. His PSU ceramic sculpture work led him to Robert Arneson, and a University of California, Davis (UC Davis), master of fine arts degree in 1972, as well as his association with other faculty members William T. Wiley, Wayne Thiebaud, Roy De Forest, Manuel Neri, and fellow students John E. Buck, Jock Reynolds, Richard T. Notkin, Deborah Butterfield, and John Roloff.

== Teaching ==
Snyder taught at Pennsylvania State University (PSU), 1975 until 1976; University of California, Santa Cruz (UCSC), 1987 until 1993; and San Francisco State University (SFSU), 1994.

== Works ==
Snyder is known for his life-size classical inspired ceramic figures, such as The Restoration of Hope 2, located in the Manetti Shrem Museum of Art, Mondavi Art Garden, University of California Davis, and his painted cut-out sculptures which he uses in public art works such as Welcome North, Welcome South, Welcome East, Welcome West, commissioned by the San Francisco International Airport and the San Francisco Arts Commission in 1983.

Of his ceramic figures, Maria Porges wrote in American Ceramics, December 1990, “Snyder‘s method of assembling the figure out of a shell of fragments often creates an astonishing lightness of being at the same time the whorl of vigorous modeled fragments out of which the angel emerges suggest clay’s original state. The spirit lives forever, Snyder implies, even though the flesh does not.” and, “By both drawing on the past and placing his work firmly in the context of the present, Snyder has brought his pieces into the dialogue about mortality and the body, which presently occupies the art world.”

Snyder has been represented by the Wenger Gallery in San Francisco, San Diego, Mexico City, and Los Angeles, the Allrich Gallery in San Francisco from 1976, alternating numerous ceramic and mixed media solo exhibitions until its closure in 1993, and Sloan Miyasato Fine Arts, San Francisco.

Snyder has completed over twenty mixed media public works, including Promenade Stockton, California, Chicken Corn Soup & Homemade Ice Cream, Rockville, Maryland, and The Secret Ingredient, Coca-Cola Company, Atlanta. Snyder also completed four public commissions that were community based collaborations with children, including My Time, Stockton, California, Fantasy Island, Sunnyvale, California, Hey Buddy – Seen Any Moose? Fairbanks, Alaska, Look What I Found, Tacoma, Washington, and A Few of My Favorite Things, Albany, California.

Snyder’s work is represented in the public and corporate collections of the SFO Museum, Oakland Museum of California, Lannan Foundation, Los Angeles, Monterey Museum of Art, University of California, Davis, The American Academy in Rome, Crocker Art Museum, TRW inc, Bank of America Center San Francisco, Pennsylvania State University, Hyatt, Kaiser Permanente, Oliver Carr Co., Washington DC, and Milpitas, California.

== Awards and honors ==
While working towards his MFA degree at UC Davis, Snyder received a University of California Davis Patent Grant in 1972 for research with lightweight clay bodies. Snyder was a recipient of the National Endowment for the Arts projects grant in 1973, which enabled him to obtain special permission to visit and study the closed to the public Lascaux Cave in France and the prehistoric rock drawings in Val Camonica, Italy.

In 1975 working alongside other Academy members Laurie Olin, Mark Balet, Frank Holmes, and Franklin D. Israel, Snyder became a fellow of the American Academy in Rome in sculpture, having received the Rome Prize in 1973. In 2007 Snyder received the AIA, Sierra Valley Honor Award for Excellence in Design for My Time, an interactive sundial artwork and streetscape design in collaboration with the children of Van Buskirk Community Center, Stockton, California, in association with LDA Partners, 2007.

== Film ==
His ceramic figurative sculpture was used in the film “Basic Instinct”, 1992.

== See also ==
- List of fellows of the American Academy in Rome (1971–1990)
