= Core City Park =

Public-use park in Detroit, Michigan, USA

- Interactive map of Core City Park
- Location: Detroit, Michigan, U.S.
- Coordinates: 42°20′55″N 83°5′18″W
- Area: 10,000-square-foot
- Website: http://www.princeconcepts.com/core-city-park

Core City Park is a privately owned, public use urban greenspace in the Core City neighborhood of Detroit. Developed by Prince Concepts and designed and executed in collaboration with landscape architect Julie Bargmann, Core City Park oversaw the conversion of a former asphalt parking lot, into a 10,000-square-foot public space with 110 newly planted trees.

== History ==
Prior to serving as a parking lot, the plot was formerly the site of Detroit Fire Department's Engine 12, operating from 1893 until the mid-1970s.

One of many recent, large-scale developments projects in Detroit, Robin Elizabeth Runyan, writing for Curbed, noted how in Core City Park "a different development has taken raw materials—galvanized steel, a parking lot, industrial buildings—to create a whole new district out of mostly vacant spaces. And while it's not going to solve pressing housing problems in the city, its approach could at least inspire other developers to think more creatively about placemaking."

With Core City Park operating as a "nucleus" and model of commercial development in the wider Core City area, Prince Concepts has subsequently overseen more than a dozen projects in the neighborhood, including Caterpillar and PARK(ing), a parking lot and green space. Complementing the neighboring Core City Park, PARK(ing), also designed by landscape architect Julie Bargmann, was similarly developed from a former parking lot into a public use site.

== Awards ==
Core City Park has gone on to receive notable recognition in the landscape architecture community. Landscape Architecture Magazine featured the project on the cover of its October 2020 issue. Awarded the inaugural Cornelia Hahn Oberlander International Landscape Architecture Prize in 2021, Julie Bargmann's honored body of work included Core City Park among a selection of other noted projects.
