= Millefoglie (composition) =

1985 composition by Barbara Kolb

- Composed: 1985
- Published: 1985
- Recorded: 1992

Premiere
- Date: June 5, 1985
- Location: Centre Pompidou
- Conductor: Péter Eötvös
- Performers: Ensemble intercontemporain

Millefoglie (Mille-feuille) is a composition for ensemble and tape by Barbara Kolb, written on a commission from IRCAM and premiered in Paris in 1985. Regarded as one of her signature works, it was recorded for a collection of Kolb's works, Millefoglie and Other Works, in 1992.

== Composition history ==
The American composer Barbara Kolb spent a residency of nine months from 1984 at the IRCAM in Paris, where she composed Millefoglie for ensemble and tape on a commission from the institute. It was premiered at the Centre Pompidou on June 5, 1985, played by the Ensemble intercontemporain conducted by Péter Eötvös. She received the 1987 Kennedy Center Friedheim Award for it, and it became performed at major venues in Amsterdam, Helsinki, Vienna, Montreal and Tokyo.

It was published by Boosey & Hawkes in 1985. The duration is given as 19 minutes.

== Album ==
A first album of compositions exclusively by Kolb was recorded in 1992, entitled Millefoglie and Other Works. Musicians from ensembles Music Today and Nouvel Ensemble Moderne performed Millefoglie and also Extremes, Chromatic Fantasy, and Solitaire for label New World Records (80422–2), OCLC 759879778.
