= Arkansas Museum of Fine Arts =

Art museum in Arkansas, US

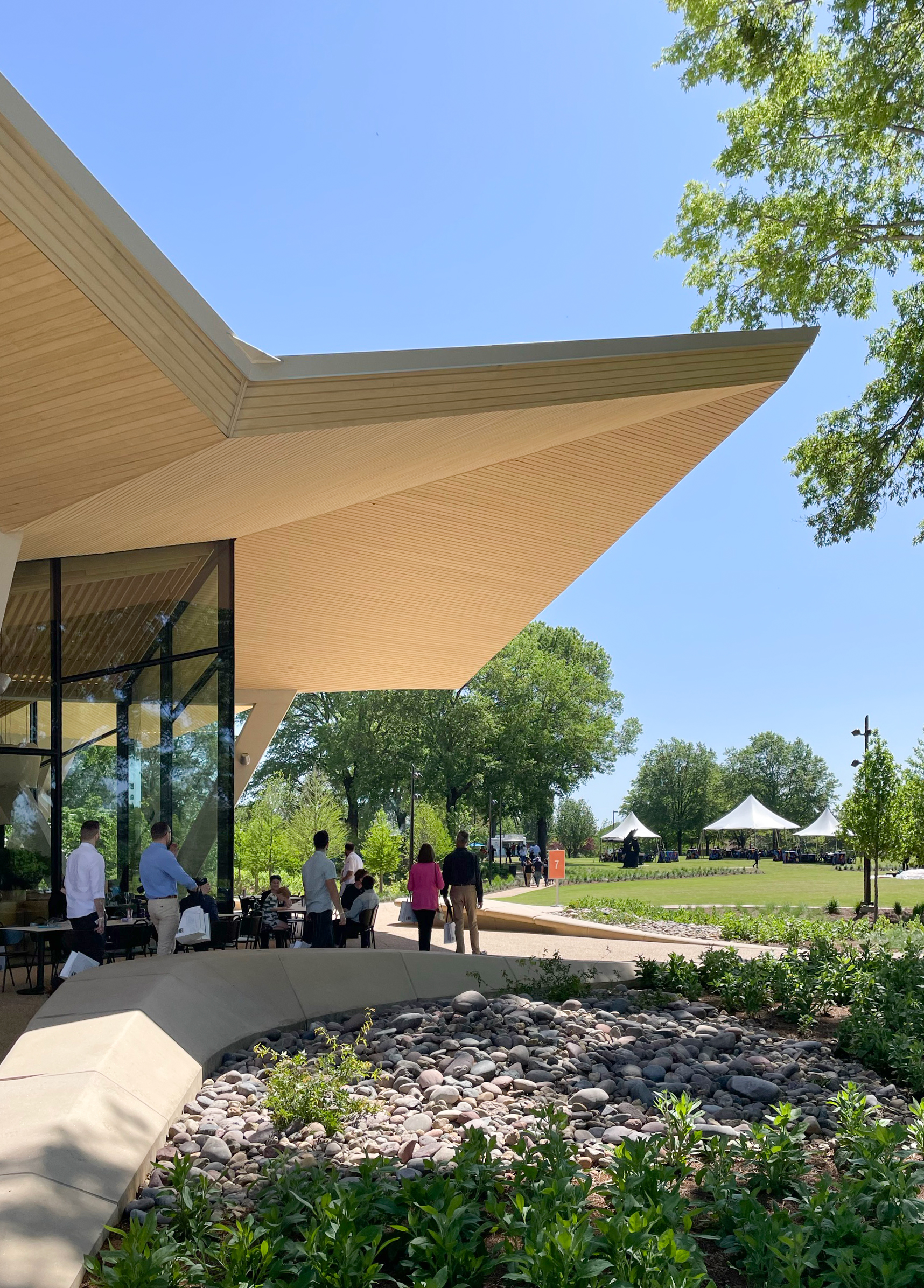

- Location within Arkansas Location within the United States
- Former name: Arkansas Arts Center
- Established: October 5, 1937 (89 years ago)
- Location: MacArthur Park, Little Rock, Arkansas, U.S.
- Type: Art museum
- Founder: Fine Arts Club of Arkansas
- Director: Dr. Victoria Ramirez
- Architects: H. Ray Burks (1936–37); Studio Gang (2018–22)
- Owner: Government of Little Rock
- Website: arkmfa.org

The Arkansas Museum of Fine Arts (AMFA), formerly known as the Arkansas Arts Center, is an art museum located in MacArthur Park, Little Rock, Arkansas. The museum's most recent expansion and renovation was designed by architecture and urban design practice Studio Gang.

The museum features a permanent collection of art along with occasional special exhibitions. Other parts include a research library and rooms for several art education classes. It also includes a restaurant and a gift shop. Many of the facilities such as the main atrium and the lecture hall can be rented for special events. The museum is a member of the North American Reciprocal Museum Association. In 2011, Arkansas.com named it one of the top 10 attractions in the state.

== Permanent collection ==
The Arkansas Museum of Fine Arts's permanent collection is focused on drawings, which the museum defines as any unique work on paper, and contemporary craft objects. The collection holds objects from such historically recognized artists such as Rembrandt, Pablo Picasso, Odilon Redon, Andrew Wyeth, and Edgar Degas. The collection also represents numerous important late 20th century and contemporary artists such as Susan Hauptman, Gregory Gillespie, John Connell, William Beckman, Enrique Chagoya, Alan Feltus, Jane Frank, John Stuart Ingle, Tim Lowly, and Odd Nerdrum. One of the highlights of the Arts Center's collection is a collection of Paul Signac drawings and watercolours; many are on public display in a gallery dedicated to the Signac collection.

== Regular shows ==
The Arkansas Museum of Fine Arts hosts the Annual Delta Exhibition, a juried exhibition of artists from Arkansas and its border states, Louisiana, Mississippi, Missouri, Oklahoma, Tennessee and Texas. The exhibition was founded in 1958 to feature contemporary work by artists born in or currently living in the Mississippi Delta region. The museum also host an Annual Collectors Show & Sale. The curators of the museum bring in works—principally drawings—from a variety of galleries from New York and around the country. This gives local collectors access to works they wouldn't normally see and the general public to see the works of a number of contemporary artists.

A competitive show of works from local school children is held annually as well. The Young Arkansas Artists show displays works from grades K-12 and awards prizes and honorable mentions for outstanding work. Schools with winning entries receive monetary awards to help promote their art programs. The Arkansas Museum of Fine Arts also organizes their National Drawing Invitational on a semi-regular basis. The show was designed to enhance to medium of drawing and to further awareness of draftsmanship as a contemporary art.

== Children's theater ==
Recognized by The Drama League as a top regional theater companies in America, the Arkansas Museum of Fine Arts Children's Theatre is the only professional company in Arkansas that produces children's literary works for the stage. The Children's Theater is a popular attraction featuring plays of classic children's stories. The Children's Theater gives children both the opportunity to witness live performances and to participate in stage productions.

== Museum school ==
The Arkansas Museum of Fine Arts' Museum School offers courses in a variety of media. Classes in life drawing, Ceramics, photography, woodworking, and jewelry, as well as workshops by visiting artists and children's classes are available. The school holds a sale of student work the Saturday before Thanksgiving each year.

== Architecture ==
The museum opened in 1937 in an Art Deco building constructed by the Works Progress Administration and designed by architect H. Ray Burks. Located in MacArthur Park, the original building features a limestone façade designed by Little Rock artist Benjamin D. Brantley and two carved relief figures, Painting and Sculpture personified.

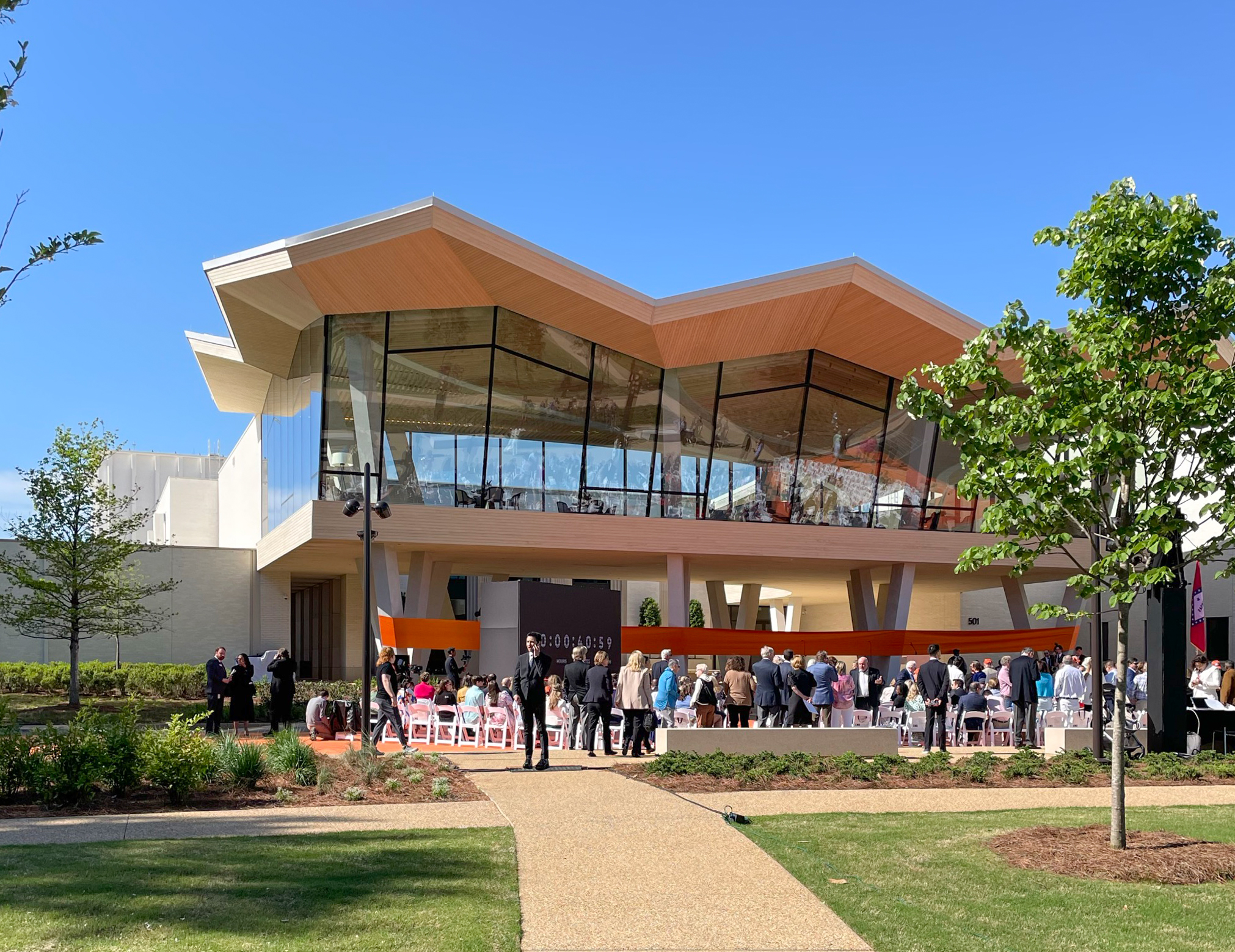
The exterior of Studio Gang's addition to the Arkansas Museum of Fine Arts, featuring the second floor Cultural Living Room.

Over the decades, the museum grew into a collection of eight structures, built in different eras and expressing multiple architectural styles. In 2016, architecture and urban design firm Studio Gang and landscape architect SCAPE were selected to reimagine the museum. The design restored and renewed as many of the existing buildings as possible, preserving their most carbon-intensive elements. A new central addition with a curving concrete structure and folded-plate roof spans the length of the building, improving the flow of visitors across the site. Blossoming out at the north and south ends, the central addition forms new entrances and public spaces that connect to the surrounding park and city beyond. The original Art Deco façade, which had become concealed by earlier additions, has been returned as the museum's main entrance.

The $142 million renovation was completed in April 2023. The museum has reported record-breaking visitor numbers, drawing over 155,000 guests from 18 countries in its first year following the renovation.

== See also ==
- Community Gallery at the Terry House
- MacArthur Museum of Arkansas Military History
- Old State House Museum
- William J. Clinton Presidential Library and Museum
