= Savior of the World =

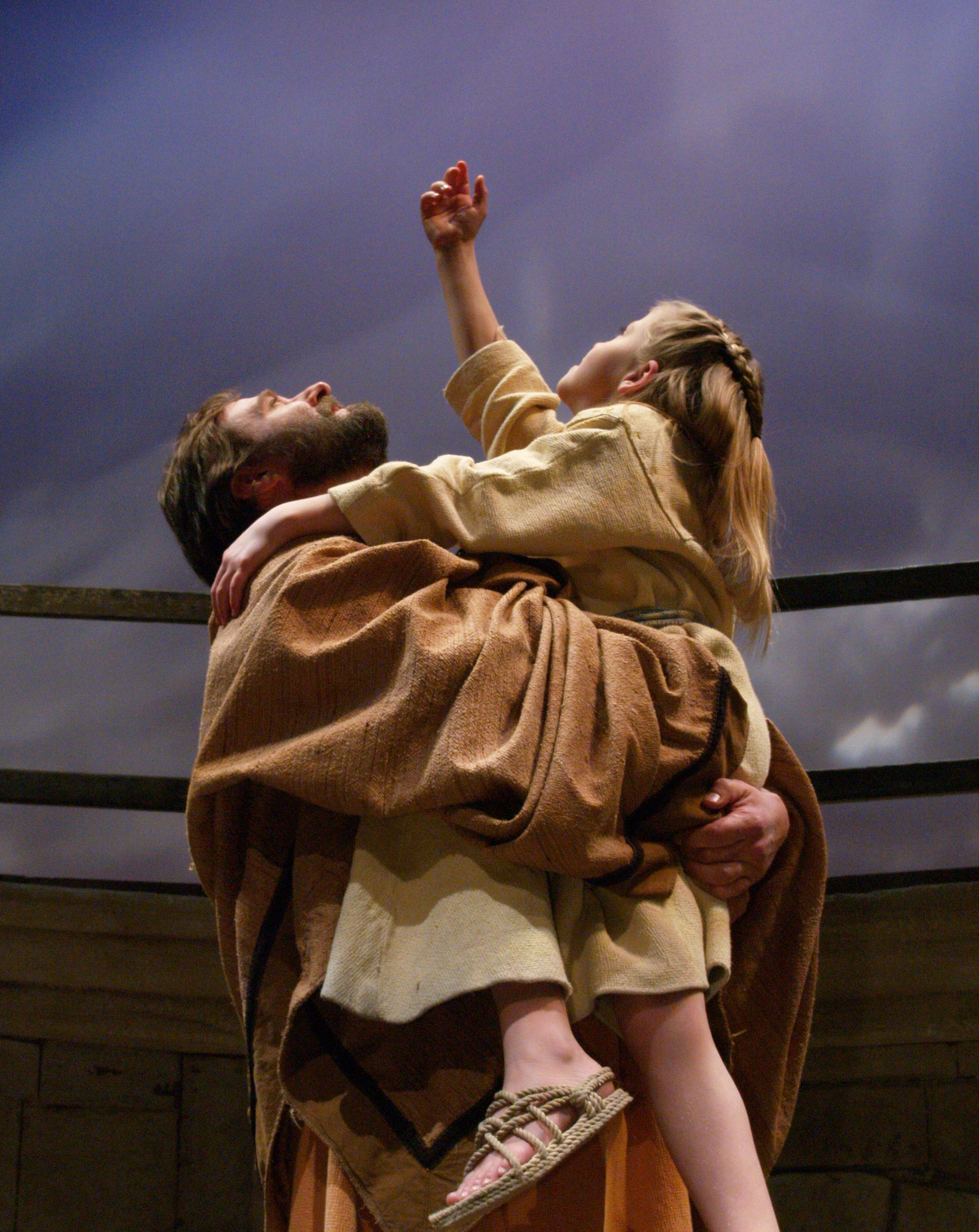
- Basis: Life of Jesus Christ
- Premiere: 2000: Salt Lake City

Savior of the World: His Birth and Resurrection is a musical dramatic production produced by the Church of Jesus Christ of Latter-day Saints ("the Church of Jesus Christ"). The production depicts the Biblical accounts of the events surrounding the birth and resurrection of Jesus Christ. Prophecies of the Christ's birth and resurrection in the Old Testament and The Book of Mormon are also quoted.

It premiered November 28, 2000 in the Conference Center Theater on Temple Square in Salt Lake City, Utah and has been presented annually near the Easter and Christmas holidays, though the Easter performances have not occurred on Temple Square since 2005. It was performed in the Washington D.C. Temple Visitors' Center Theater for the first time during the Easter season of 2014.

Scripting and music have been fluid during the history of the production, as revisions of the materials have occurred from one year to the next. However the core of the production has always focused on the birth of Jesus for Act I and Jesus' resurrection for Act II. In 2006, an official script and score was released for limited use throughout the Church.
