= Nauvoo Bell =

Bell in Salt Lake City, Utah, U.S.

Coordinates: 40°46′12.2″N 111°53′37.2″W

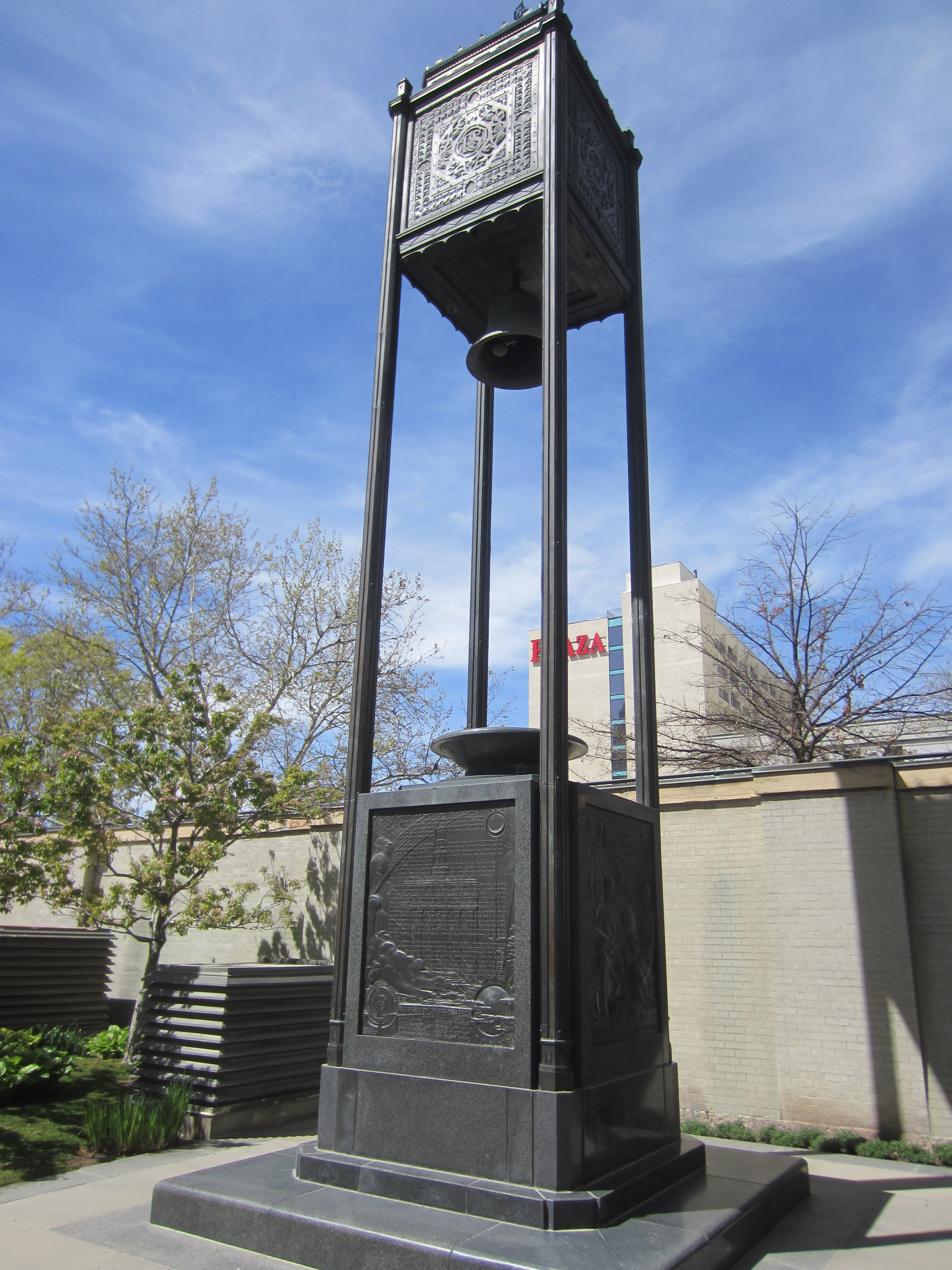
- Interactive map of Nauvoo Bell
- Location: Salt Lake City, Utah, U.S.
- Type: Bell tower

The Nauvoo Bell, also known as the Relief Society Memorial Campanile, was a bell tower in Salt Lake City's Temple Square, in the U.S. state of Utah.

It is also a name of the 1,500-pound bell in that tower, more accurately known as the Hummer Bell. This bell is frequently confused with the bell from the Nauvoo Temple that was brought from Nauvoo, Illinois, by Charles C. Rich’s company of pioneers.

== History ==
The original Nauvoo Bell was used as a signal bell in Nauvoo, Winter Quarters, and then at Temple Square in Salt Lake City. It cracked in the harsh winter of 1849–50 and was likely melted down in an attempt to recast the bell.

The Hummer Bell was originally purchased from the Meneely Bell Foundry in Troy, New York, for the First Presbyterian Church of Iowa City. Rev. Michael Hummer oversaw the construction of the building and the purchase of the bell, but was expelled by the church. During a dispute over his final pay from the church, Michael Hummer and James W. Margrave attempted to steal the bell to use in Hummer's new church in Keokuk, Iowa. During the attempted theft, a group of men from Iowa City stole the bell from Hummer and Margrave, hiding it in the Iowa River near the mouth of Rapid Creek. When the Iowa City men traveled west to join the California gold rush in 1850, they took the bell with them and sold it to Asa Calkin in Salt Lake City, who purchased it on behalf of the Church of Jesus Christ of Latter-day Saints. The Hummer Bell remained in storage until 1939, when it was put on display in a church museum in Salt Lake City. At that time, it was confused with both the original Nauvoo Bell and a bell at Brigham Young's schoolhouse, and began to be used as a pioneer relic.

When the Relief Society, led by Amy B. Lyman, planned to celebrate their organization's centennial anniversary in March 1942, they decided to create a bell tower for Temple Square to house the Hummer Bell. They commissioned Avard Fairbanks to create sculpted bas-relief panels that celebrated the Relief Society's contributions to women's progress, and had Flour City Ornamental Iron Works Company create the main structural piece, including decorative grillwork for the top of the tower. They initially planned to install it between the Tabernacle and the Temple on Temple Square. Disruptions associated with WWII and construction on Temple Square, however, delayed the installation of the bell tower until 1966.

The 35-foot tower displays multiple sculptures, specifically the 1942 works by Avard Fairbanks. Benevolence depicts women and children and measures approximately 4 feet tall by 3 feet wide. Pioneering has the same dimensions and depicts a family with one man, one woman, and two children. Both works, collectively known as the Bell Tower Plaques, were surveyed by the Smithsonian Institution's Save Outdoor Sculpture!" program in 1993.

== Return to Iowa City ==
During the 2020s, renovations to Temple Square included the removal of the bell tower. The bell was then returned by the Church of Jesus Christ of Latter-day Saints to the First Presbyterian Church of Iowa City in 2025. The Hummer Bell is now housed in an arch structure and rung with electronic chimes. It was dedicated at its new home on October 5, 2025.
