= Barbara Kolb =

American composer (1938–2024)

- Kolb in the 1970s
- Born: February 10, 1938; Hartford, Connecticut, U.S.
- Died: October 21, 2024 (aged 86); North Providence, Rhode Island, U.S.
- Education: Hartt College of Music
- Occupations: Composer; academic teacher
- Organizations: Third Street Music School Settlement
- Awards: Rome Prize

Barbara Kolb (February 10, 1938 – October 21, 2024) was an American composer and educator, the first woman to win the Rome Prize in musical composition. Her music features sound masses of colorful textures, impressionistic sounds and atonal vocabulary, with influences from literary and visual arts. She taught at the Third Street Music School Settlement, Rhode Island College and Eastman School of Music.

== Life and music ==
Kolb was born in Hartford, Connecticut, on February 10, 1938 (many sources erroneously state her birth year as 1939). As her father was the music director of WTIC there, she was exposed to music early, meeting musicians. She went to jazz clubs with her parents.

Kolb studied clarinet and composition at the Hartt College of Music (now The Hartt School) at the University of Hartford with Arnold Franchetti, receiving her B.M. (cum laude) in 1961 and her M.M. degree in 1964. Kolb was a proficient clarinetist. At the Berkshire Music Center in Tanglewood, she studied composition with Lukas Foss and Gunther Schuller. Following her graduation, Kolb relocated to Vienna, Austria, from 1966 to 1967 with a Fulbright Fellowship grant.

Kolb was the first female American composer to win the Rome Prize, in 1969–1971. Kolb's composition Soundings was premiered by the Chamber Music Society of Lincoln Center in 1972. It was performed in a revised version for orchestra in 1975, played by the New York Philharmonic conducted by Pierre Boulez, with the orchestra positioned in three groups on the stage. She received commissions from the Fromm Foundation at Harvard University.

From 1979 to 1982, Kolb served as the artistic director of contemporary music at the Third Street Music School Settlement, where she presented the "Music New to New York" concert series, a series that featured composers from outside New York City. Additionally, she had a teaching career at Rhode Island College and at Eastman School of Music as a visiting professor in composition, as well as an association with The MacDowell Colony. She developed a course in music theory course for blind and physically disabled people from 1982 to 1986.

In 1983–1984, Kolb was in residence at IRCAM in Paris for nine months, where she received the commission for Millefoglie. The piece was premiered at the Centre Pompidou in Paris on June 5, 1985, by the Ensemble intercontemporain conducted by Péter Eötvös. She received the 1987 Kennedy Center Friedheim Award for it, and it became performed at major venues Amsterdam, Helsinki, Vienna, Montreal and Tokyo. Kolb composed Voyants, a concerto for piano and chamber orchestra, in 1991, dedicated to the memory of Aaron Copland. Commissioned by Radio France, it received its world premiere at the Théâtre des Champs-Élysées with soloist Jay Gottlieb and the Orchestre philharmonique de Radio France, conducted by Joel Revsen.

A selection of Kolb's compositions were featured at the Kennedy Center in Washington, D.C., performed by the Theatre Chamber Players in 1992, including the American premiere of Voyant and the world premiere of Introduction and Allegra for guitar.

Kolb composed All in Good Time on a commission from New York Philharmonic for its 150th anniversary in 1993. The world premiere was played in 1994 conducted by Leonard Slatkin, who also led performances of it with the St. Louis Symphony Orchestra and the San Francisco Symphony. It was recorded by the Grant Park Symphony Orchestra, conducted by Carlos Kalmar, along with works by John Corigliano, Aaron Jay Kernis, John Harbison and Michael Hersch on a CD released by Cedille Records in 2006. Albums devoted solely to Kolb's music have been released by CRI and New World Records. Her music is published exclusively by Boosey and Hawkes.

Kolb died at her home in North Providence, Rhode Island, on October 21, 2024, at the age of 86.

== Compositions ==
Kolb's music was sometimes inspired by literary and visual arts. It features sound masses, often in vertical structures through simultaneous rhythmic or melodic units (motifs or figures). Kolb's musical style can be identified by her use of colorful textures, impressionistic touch, and atonal vocabulary. Some compositions are influenced by minimal music, some feature "a distinct jazz influence".

Her works have been published by Boosey & Hawkes, including:

- Three Medieval Chants for saxophone quartet, 2005–2018
- Aubade for mandolin orchestra, 2003
- The Web Spinner for chamber orchestra, 2003
- Antoine's Tango for piano, 2001
- Introduction and Allegro for wind band, 2001
- Virgo Mater Creatrix (Virgin Mother Creatrix) for a cappella choir, 1998
- New York Moonglow, ballet, for ensemble, 1995
- Sidebars for bassoon and piano, 1995/96
- Turnabout in one movement, for flute and piano, 1994
- In Memory of David Huntley for string quartet, 1994
- All in Good Time for orchestra, 1993
- Cloudspin (Cumulus) for organ, 1991, rev. 2007
- Voyants for piano and chamber orchestra, 1991
- Monticello Trio in two movements, for piano trio, 1991
- Extremes for flute and cello, 1988/89
- The Enchanted Loom in three untitled movements, for orchestra, 1988/89
- Broken Slurs for guitar, 1988
- Yet That Things Go Round for chamber orchestra, 1987
- Umbrian Colors for guitar and violin, 1986
- Time... And Again for oboe, string quartet and computer-generated sounds, 1985
- Cavatina for violin or viola solo, 1983, rev. 1985
- Millefoglie for ensemble and tape, 1984/85
- Cantico for electronics, 1982
- Related Characters for clarinet (or trumpet, or saxophone, or viola) and piano, 1982
- The Point that Divides the Wind for organ, four percussionists, and three male voices, 1982
- Three Lullabies for guitar, 1980
- Chromatic Fantasy for narrator and six instruments, 1979
- Grisaille for orchestra, 1978/79
- Homage to Keith Jarrett and Gary Burton for flute and vibraphone, 1976
- Appello for piano, 1976
- Songs Before an Adieu for soprano, flute/alto flute, and guitar, 1976–79
- Looking for Claudio for guitar and pre-recorded tape, 1975
- Spring River Flowers Moon Night for two pianos and pre-recorded tape, 1974/75
- Soundings for orchestra, 1971/72, rev. 1975, 1978
- Soundings for chamber ensemble and pre-recorded tape, 1971/72
- Solitaire for piano and pre-recorded tape, 1971
- Toccata for harpsichord and pre-recorded tape, 1971
- Trobar Clos for chamber ensemble, 1970
- Crosswinds for wind ensemble and percussion, 1969
- Rebuttal for two clarinets, 1965

Early works not in the Boosey & Hawkes catalogue include:

- Fanfare, 1970
- Pulse & Counterflux, 1968
- New York-Le Havre, 1968
- Three Place Settings, 1968
- Four Approaches, 1967
- Chanson Bas, 1966
- Sequela for orchestra, 1965
- The Pleasures of Merely Circulating for chorus, 1964
- Three Songs for baritone and piano, 1964

== Discography ==
=== Albums with exclusively Kolb's music ===
- Barbara Kolb: Millefoglie and Other Works (1992). Music Today and Nouvel Ensemble Moderne. Includes Kolb's Millefoglie, Extremes, Chromatic Fantasy, and Solitaire (New World Records 80422–2). OCLC 759879778
- Barbara Kolb: Soundings and Other Works (1990). Ensemble intercontemporain conducted by Arthur Tamayo; Igor Kipnis, harpsichord; Jay Gottlieb, piano, etc.; includes Kolb's Soundings (1971–72), Toccata (1971), Appello (1976), Looking for Claudio (1975), and Spring River Flowers Moon Night (1974–75) (Composers Recordings Inc. CD 576). OCLC 247763725

=== Other albums ===
- Related Characters – featuring Bill Perconti, James March, and Iowa Brass Quintet – includes Kolb's Related Characters for alto saxophone and piano (1982) (Centaur). OCLC 908675381
- American Orchestra Works – featuring the Grant Park Symphony Orchestra conducted by Carlos Kalmar – includes Kolb's All in Good Time (1993) (Cedille). OCLC 8051046593
