= Temple Square =

- U.S. National Register of Historic Places
- U.S. National Historic Landmark District
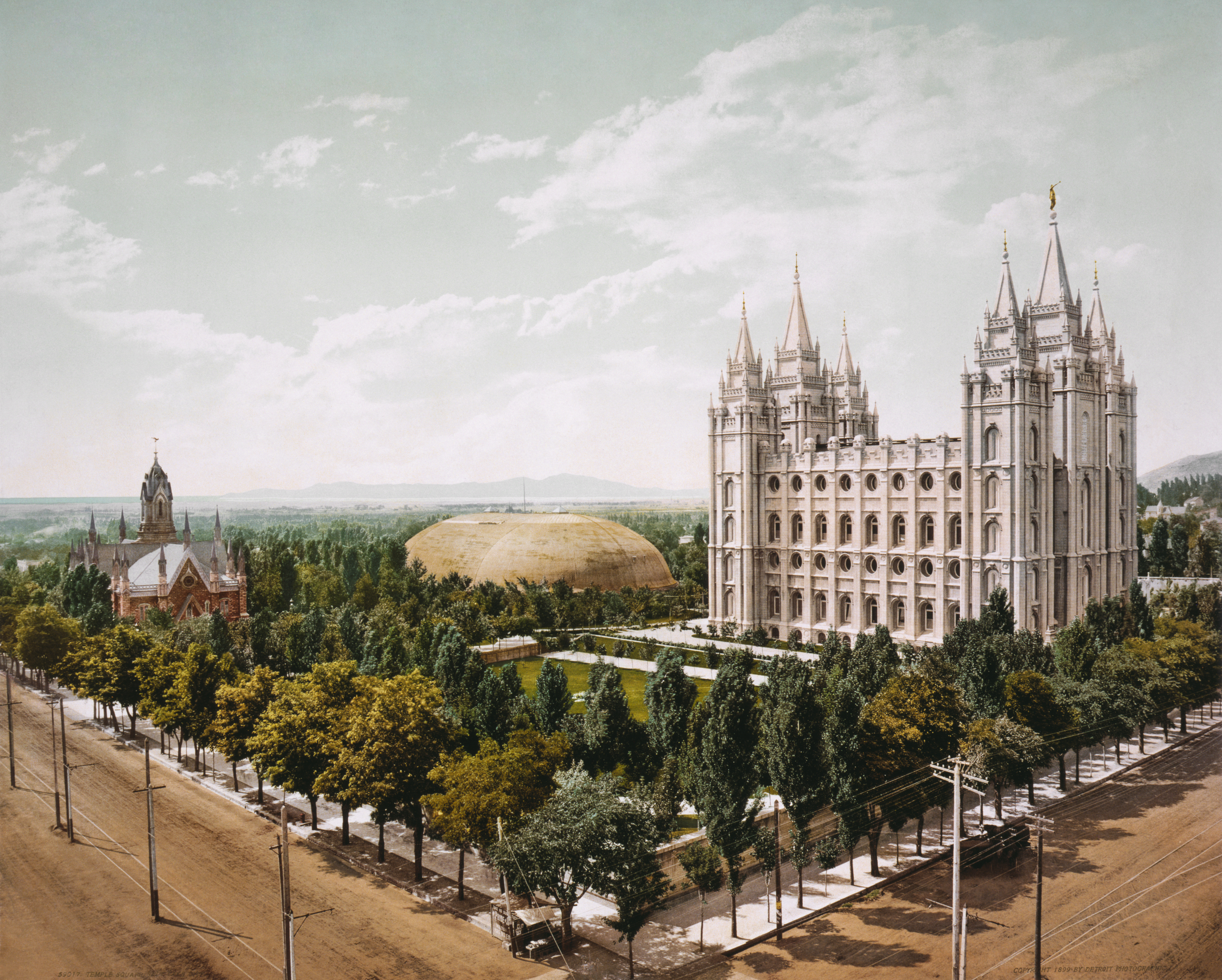
- Temple Square, approx 1898–1905, showing the Salt Lake Temple, Salt Lake Tabernacle and Salt Lake Assembly Hall

- Location within Utah Location within the United States
- Location: Salt Lake City, Utah, U.S.
- Coordinates: 40°46′14″N 111°53′33″W
- Area: 10 acres (4.0 ha)
- Built: 1853
- NRHP reference No.: 66000738

Significant dates
- Added to NRHP: October 15, 1966
- Designated NHLD: January 29, 1964

Temple Square is a 10-acre (4.0 ha) complex, owned by the Church of Jesus Christ of Latter-day Saints (LDS Church), in the center of Salt Lake City, Utah, United States. The usage of the name has gradually changed to include several other church facilities that are immediately adjacent to Temple Square. Contained within Temple Square are the Salt Lake Temple, Salt Lake Tabernacle, Salt Lake Assembly Hall, the Seagull Monument, and two visitors' centers. The square was designated a National Historic Landmark District in 1964, recognizing the Mormon achievement in the settlement of Utah.

== History ==
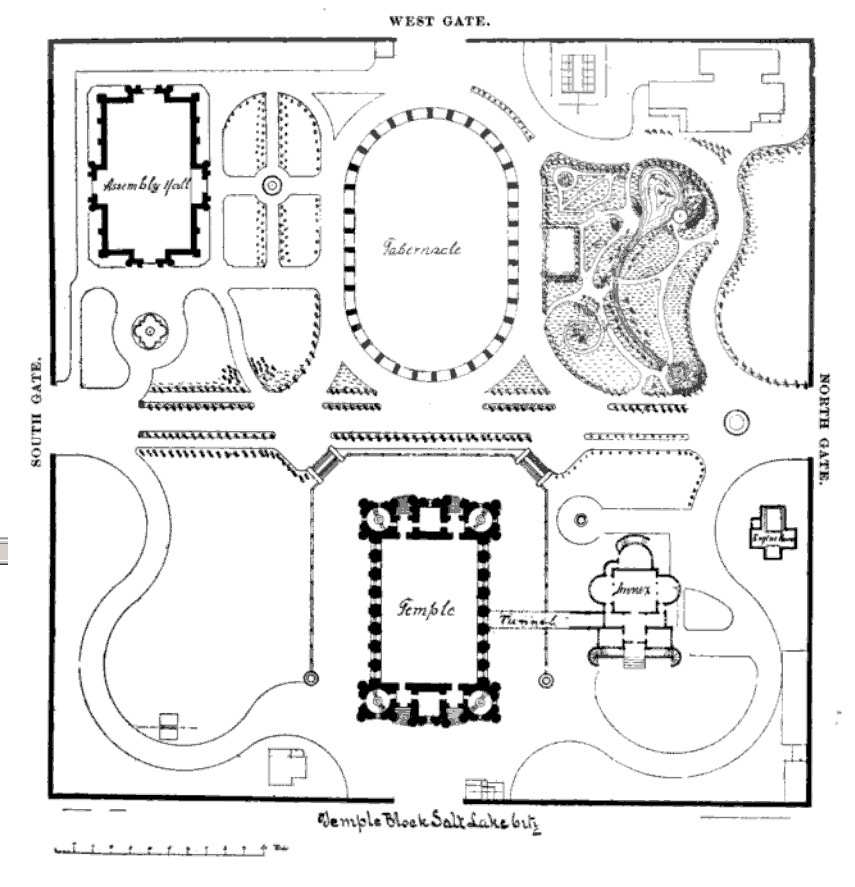
Layout of Temple Square, circa 1893.

Temple Square and the surrounding area in 2013.

In 1847, when Mormon pioneers arrived in the Salt Lake Valley, church president Brigham Young selected a plot of the desert ground, initially referred to as Temple Block, and proclaimed, "Here we will build a temple to our God." When the city was surveyed, the block enclosing that location was designated for the temple, and became known as Temple Square. Temple Square is surrounded by a 15-foot wall that was built shortly after the block was designated.

The square also became the headquarters of the LDS Church. Other buildings were built on the plot, including a tabernacle (prior to the one occupying Temple Square today) and Endowment House, both of which were later torn down. The Salt Lake Tabernacle, home of the Tabernacle Choir at Temple Square, was built in 1867 to accommodate the church's general conferences, with a seating capacity of 8,000. Another church building, the Salt Lake Assembly Hall, was later built with a seating capacity of 2,000.

As the church has grown, its headquarters have expanded into the surrounding area. In 1917, an administration building was built on the block east of the temple and in 1972, a twenty-eight story office building, which was, for many years, the tallest building in the state of Utah. The Hotel Utah, another building on this block, was remodeled in 1995 as additional office space and a large film theater and renamed the Joseph Smith Memorial Building. In 2000, the church purchased the section of Main Street between this block and Temple Square and connected the two blocks with a plaza called the Main Street Plaza. In 2000, the church completed a new, 21,000 seat conference center on the block north of Temple Square.

In 2020, many of the buildings on and around Temple Square were closed for a time due to the COVID-19 pandemic, and the multi-year renovation project.

=== 1999 Salt Lake City tornado ===
On August 11, 1999, a tornado, rated F2 on the Fujita scale and the worst in Utah history, hit Salt Lake City and passed over Temple Square. People at the Salt Lake Temple for a wedding huddled together as the tornado passed over the historic block. Over its path, the tornado caused $150 million in damage, killed one person, and injured more than 150. It uprooted trees, split branches in half, destroyed landscaping, and broke windows at the visitors' center that housed the Christus statute. A popular spot for photos under a 50-year-old honeysuckle shrub named the "Sweetheart Tree," was completely uprooted, too damaged to be replanted. Temple Square was shut down for a day for damage assessment and repair, and opened the next day, where activities proceeded as normal.

== Modern usage ==
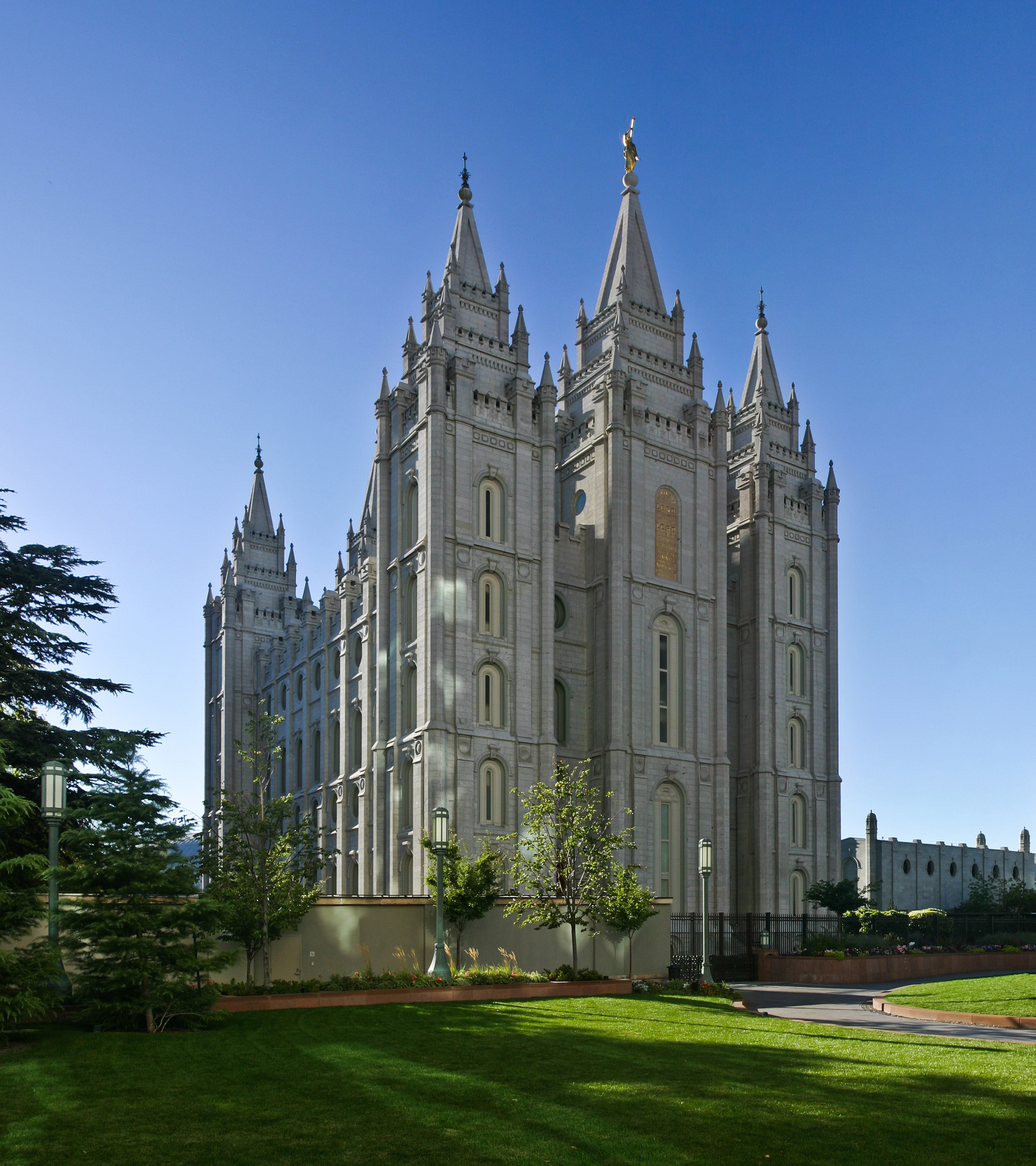
Salt Lake Temple

=== Tourism ===
Attracting an estimate of 5-plus million visitors a year, Temple Square in downtown Salt Lake City is one of the most popular tourist attractions in Utah. The LDS Church does not provide exact statistical data on the number of visits to Temple Square, but visitation is estimated to similar to that of the Grand Canyon or Yellowstone National Park. Visitation to Utah's five national parks—Zion, Bryce Canyon, Capitol Reef, Canyonlands, and Arches—had a combined total of approximately 9 million visitors in 2022.

=== Lighting ===
The grounds, as well as the Gardens at Temple Square, often host concerts and other events. During the Christmas holiday season, approximately 100,000 Christmas lights sparkle from trees and shrubs around Temple Square each evening until 10 pm. The lighting of Temple Square is a popular event, usually attended by more than 10,000 people.

=== Other uses ===
The multiple gates to Temple Square are popular places for critics of the LDS Church—mainly former members and activist evangelical ministers—to picket and hand out tracts and literature critical of the church. They are also well-known locations for street musicians to perform, especially during the holiday season.

=== Street directions ===
Temple Square serves as the center point for all street addresses in Salt Lake City. The streets in Salt Lake follow a grid pattern which deviate out from the southeast corner of Temple Square.

== Sites ==
=== Salt Lake Temple ===
The Salt Lake Temple is the largest and best-known of the church's operating temples. (Note: The LDS Church has 385 temples in various phases, which includes 227 dedicated temples (221 operating, 6 undergoing renovations), 8 with dedications scheduled, 57 under construction, 7 with groundbreaking ceremonies scheduled, and 86 others announced (not yet under construction).) It is the sixth temple built by the church since its founding, and the fourth operating temple built following the Mormon exodus from Nauvoo, Illinois.

=== North and South Visitors' Centers ===
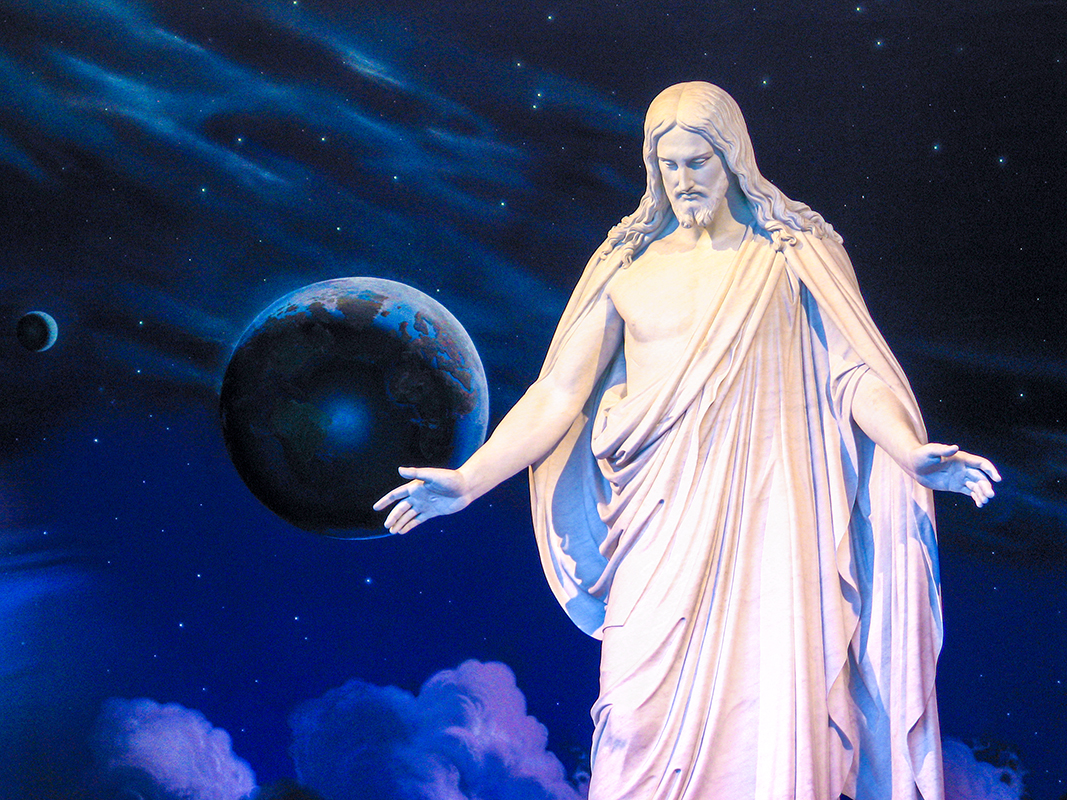
Christus statue in North Visitors' Center

Beginning in 1963, two visitors' centers, called the North Visitors' Center and the South Visitors' Center, were constructed on temple square. The North Visitors' Center was built first and featured a replica of the Christus. The Christus was in a room called the Rotunda with large windows, and a domed ceiling painted with heavenly bodies meant to reflect the sky on April 6, 1830, the day that the church was founded. The visitors' centers and grounds are staffed by full-time sister missionaries and senior missionary couples exclusively; no single male missionaries are called to serve on Temple Square. The sister missionaries serving on Temple Square are from around the world, speaking enough languages to cater to the majority of visitors. Beginning with the 2002 Winter Olympics in Salt Lake City, the sister missionaries have been wearing tags with the national flags of their home country along with their missionary name tags.

On April 19, 2019, church leaders announced that the South Visitors' Center would be demolished as part of a massive renovation project that began on December 29, 2019. Two smaller visitors' pavilions will take its place. On June 10, 2021, it was announced that the North Visitors' Center would be demolished as well. It will be replaced by a garden designed as contemplative space.

On April 13, 2026, a media preview of the new visitors' center was held. It will open to the public on May 18, 2026. The newly constructed center's lower level includes an "inside a temple" tour, which provides a guided tour of full-scale replicas of temple rooms; including a welcome desk, baptistry, instruction room, celestial room, and sealing room. Also on the lower level is a new sculpture by Swedish sculptor, Christian Bolt, titled "Come Unto Me." The new work of art depicts Christ with an outstretched hand, which Bolt described as: "with one hand, the Savior is reaching out for individuals, but with the other, He’s opening Himself to receive each one of us”, designed to be in a gesture of peace and compassion. On the ground level, the center's west wing includes a replica of the Christus statue and the east wing includes a scale model of the Salt Lake Temple, with cutaway views of the structure's interior.

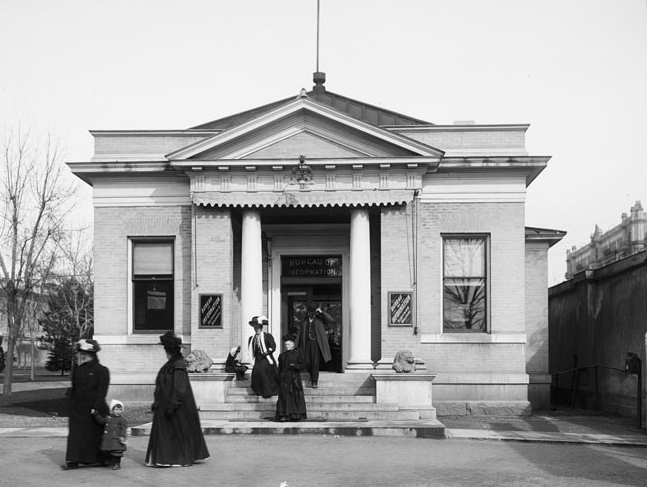
Old Bureau of Information building, which served visitors from 1904 to 1978 (1909 photo).

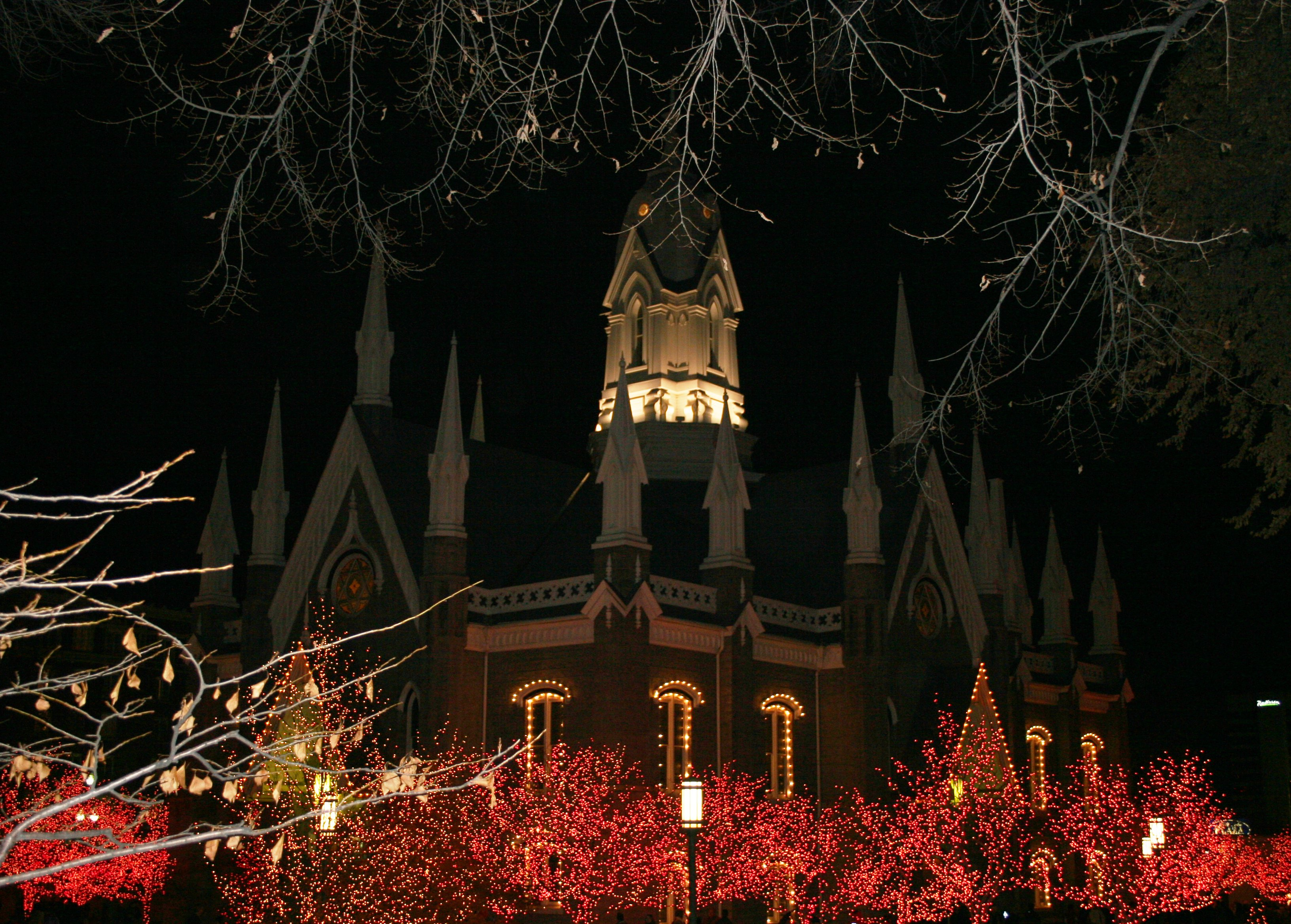
The Assembly Hall at Temple Square at Christmas time.

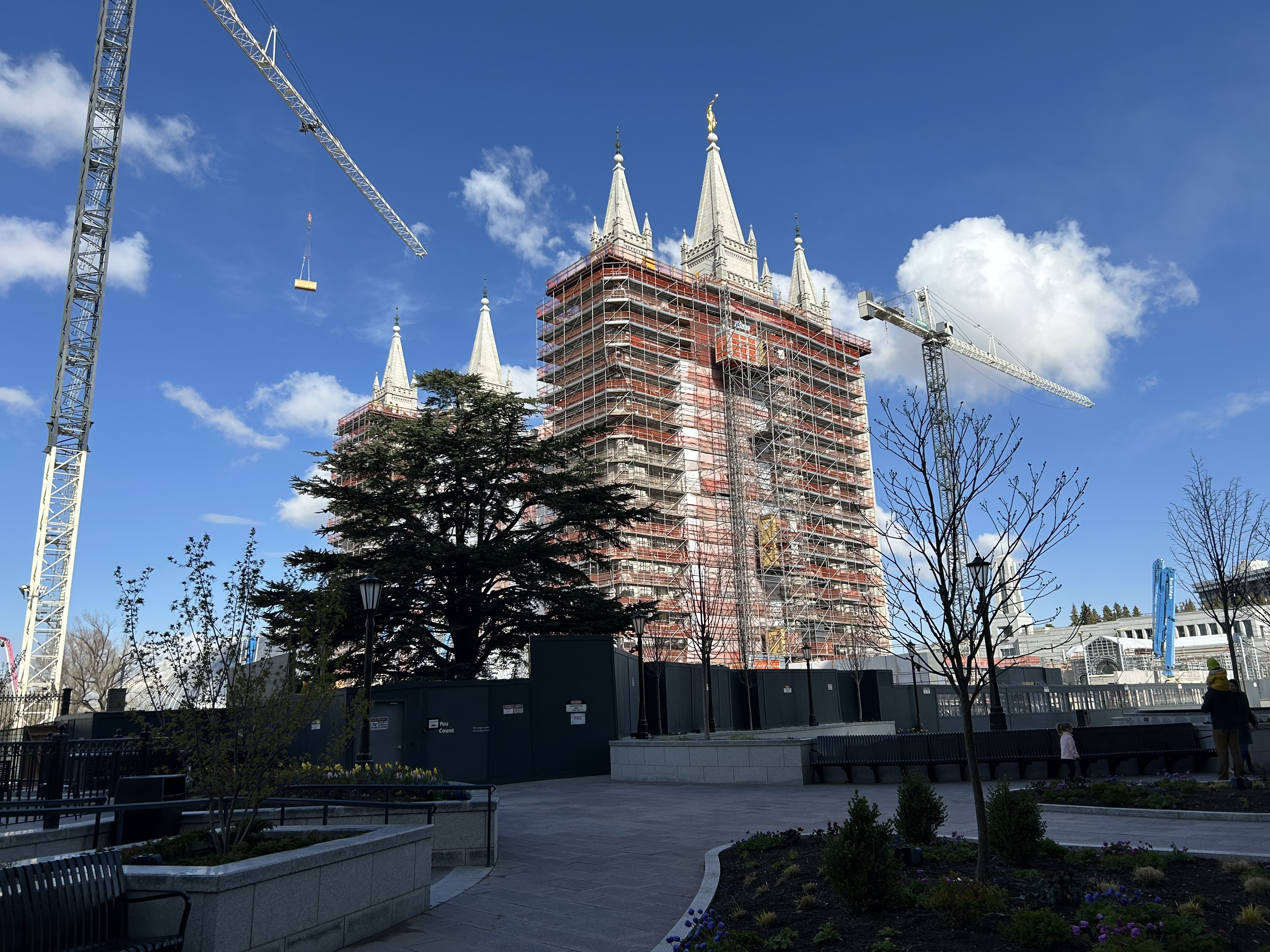
The Salt Lake Temple clad in scaffolding in April 2025 as part of Temple Square's reconstruction

=== Conference and assembly buildings ===
There are three large assembly buildings housed on Temple Square. The smallest of the three is the Salt Lake Assembly Hall, which seats approximately 2,000 and is on the southwest corner of Temple Square. The Assembly Hall is a Victorian Gothic congregation hall, with a cruciform layout of the interior that is complemented by Stars of David circumscribed high above each entrance, which symbolize the gathering of the Twelve Tribes of Israel. Construction of the hall began on August 11, 1877, and was completed in 1882. It is just south of the Salt Lake Tabernacle and across from the South Visitor Center near the South Gate. Upon entering Temple Square from the south, the Assembly Hall can be seen to the left (west). The Assembly Hall hosts occasional free weekend music concerts and is filled as overflow for the church's twice-a-year general conferences.

The second structure is the Salt Lake Tabernacle, home of the Tabernacle Choir Temple Square and Orchestra at Temple Square. The Tabernacle was built between 1864 and 1867 with an overall seating capacity of 8,000, including the choir area and gallery. In March 2007, the Tabernacle was rededicated after extensive renovations and restorations were completed. Spacing between the pews was substantially increased, resulting in a reduced overall seating capacity. The Tabernacle was rededicated during the church's general conference. In addition to housing the choir, the Tabernacle is also used for other religious and cultural events.

The largest and most recently built assembly building is the Conference Center. With a capacity of over 21,000, it is used primarily for the church's general conferences as well as for concerts and other cultural events. The Conference Center was completed in 2000. Attached on the northwest corner of the Conference Center is the Conference Center Theater, an 850-seat theater for dramatic presentations, such as Savior of the World, as well as concerts and other events.

=== Museums and libraries ===
==== FamilySearch Library ====
On the block west of Temple Square, the FamilySearch Library is the largest genealogical library in the world and is open to the general public at no charge. The library holds genealogical records for over 110 countries, territories, and possessions. Its collections include over 2.4 million rolls of microfilmed genealogical records; 742,000 microfiche; 310,000 books, serials, and other formats; 4,500 periodicals; and 700 electronic resources.

==== Church History Museum ====
On the block west of Temple Square adjacent to the Family History Library, the Church History Museum houses collections of Latter-day Saint art and artifacts. The Museum houses permanent exhibits as well as playing host to temporary exhibits throughout the year. Past exhibits have included the 100th anniversary of the Boy Scouts of America, featuring 23 paintings by Norman Rockwell; displays and artwork from artist Arnold Friberg; and themed historical displays depicting church events.

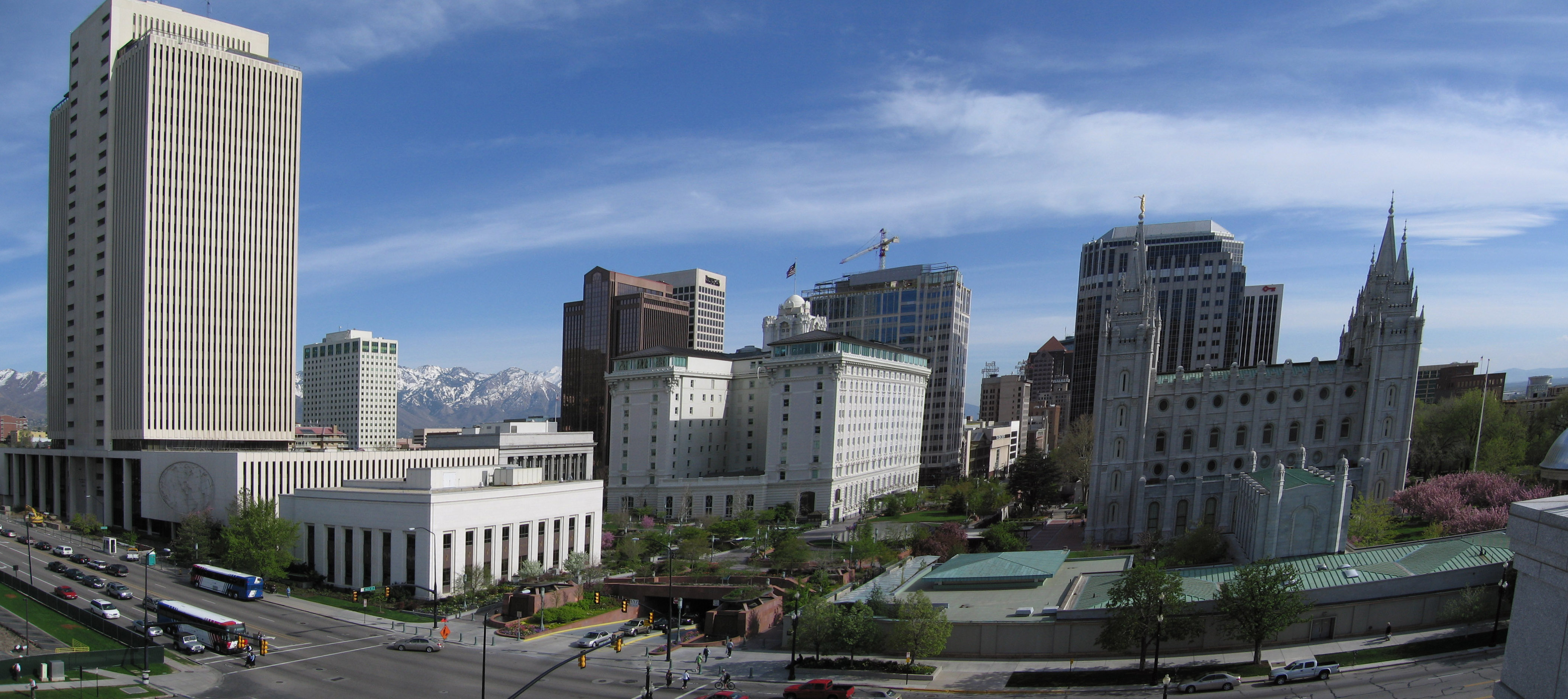
A panoramic view showing Temple Square from the Conference Center looking south.

==== Church History Library ====
On the block northeast of Temple Square and east of the Conference Center is the Church History Library, where the historical records of the Church are stored. The Library is free to patrons, who can come use a large collection of books, manuscripts, and photographs. Senior missionaries provide tours of the public areas of the Library. Patrons can also view a video explaining the mission and purpose of the Library.

== See also ==
- Brigham Young Historic Park
- List of National Historic Landmarks in Utah
- National Register of Historic Places listings in Salt Lake City
- Nauvoo Bell
- Restoration of the Aaronic Priesthood (sculpture)
- Restoration of the Melchizedek Priesthood (sculpture)
