= Gardens at Temple Square =

Gardens in Salt Lake City, Utah, U.S.

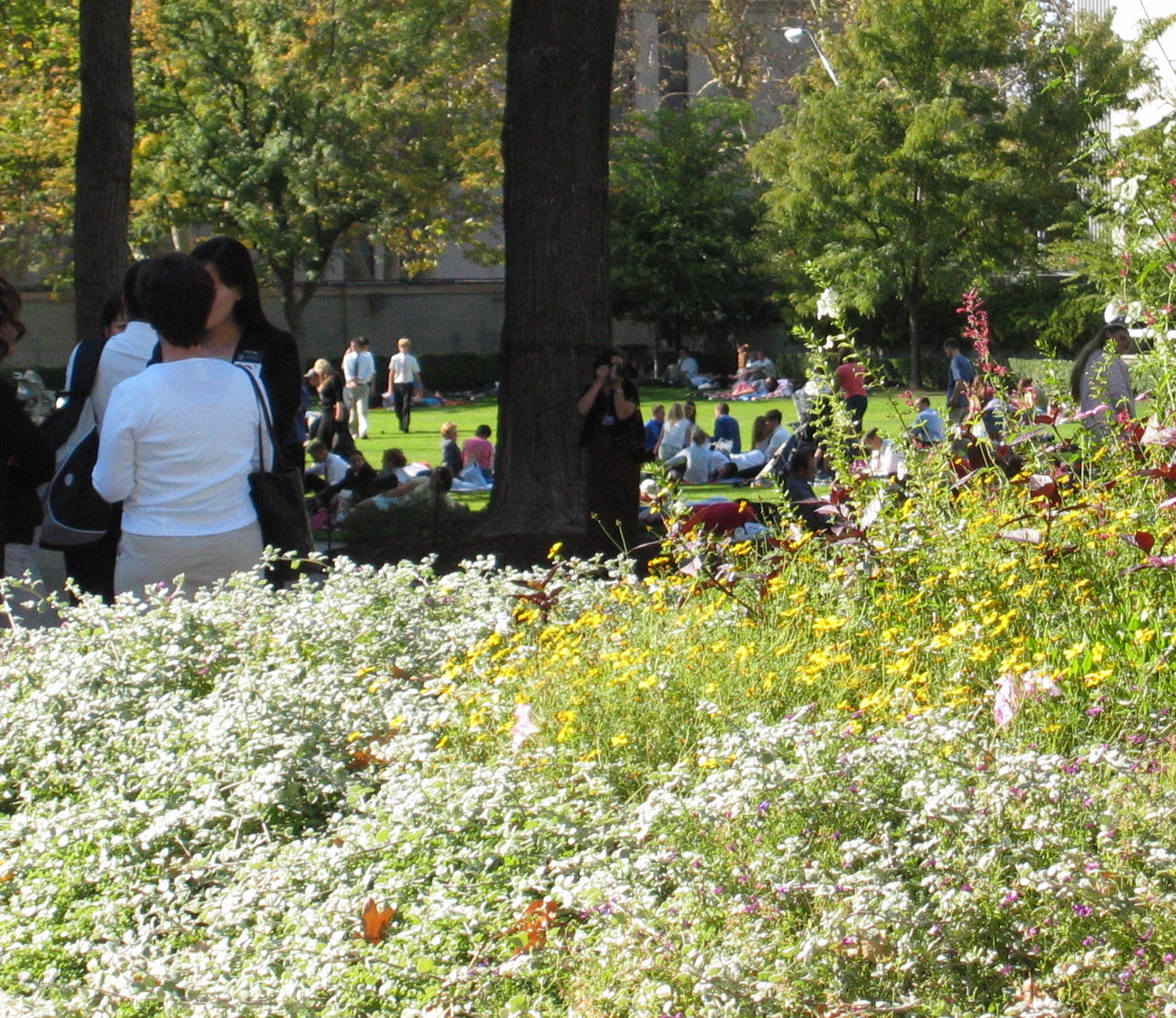
- Flower arrangement during LDS General Conference
- Interactive map of Gardens at Temple Square
- Type: Botanical
- Location: Salt Lake City, Utah
- Coordinates: 40.77041°N 111.89246°W
- Area: 14 hectares (35 acres)

Temple Square in downtown Salt Lake City is surrounded by urban gardens and parks which cover approximately 14 hectares (35 acres) within Temple Square, the Conference Center, and the area surrounding headquarters of the Church of Jesus Christ of Latter-day Saints (LDS Church). The garden on the rooftop of the Conference Center, by design, has no annual plants; it is mostly herbaceous perennials and woody plants.

The gardens at Temple Square include 250 flower beds, over 165,000 bedding plants, and over 700 varieties of plants from all over the world. The gardens are redesigned every six months and replanted mostly by volunteers and seven full-time supervising gardeners. The Salt Lake Temple used to have an attached greenhouse. Currently, the LDS Church operates four greenhouses away from Temple Square that grow all of the flowers and plants that are needed at the gardens. Most greenhouses have trial spaces to try the designs before implementing them on Temple Square.

There is free general public access to all gardens on Temple Square. Guided tours are available to some of the gardens, including those on the roof of the Conference Center. The gardening staff and volunteers string more than three hundred thousand Christmas lights along branches of trees and shrubs and around flower beds.

== History ==
The Salt Lake Valley was colonized by Mormon pioneers in the late 1840s. The valley had many creeks and streams that came out of the surrounding canyons that were lined primarily with poplars. Pioneer accounts indicate that people had to be on top of their horses and rise up in the saddle to see over the tall grass of what now is downtown Salt Lake City. Accounts seem to indicate that there only was one tree in the Valley, a juniper in an area near a monument on present day Sixth East and Third South.

LDS Church tradition has it that the garden concept originated from the suggestion of a general authority who, while traveling to the Eastern United States to visit the world's fair in 1893, wanted to bring to Salt Lake City the trees he saw in the exposition. Some of the grand elm trees planted on Temple Square from that year's world's fair still exist along the central walkway through Temple Square.

Much of the initial proposals and organization of the gardens, as well as many LDS chapels and temples in Utah, began right after the Great Depression under the supervision of Irvin T. Nelson, a valedictorian from Weber State University. Nelson took over the supervision of the Temple Square gardens after the death of his predecessor in 1944.

The Olin Partnership landscape architectural firm from Philadelphia, Pennsylvania designed the LDS Conference Center landscape.

== Planting ==
New arrangement of flowers and bedding plants are brought in each planting season. Some of the techniques used in the past range from formal French parterres to old-fashioned English cottage gardens. Using a technique called "tossing", gardeners throw the different varieties of flower packs onto the beds in a natural flow to coordinate growth. Flowers don't usually appear in single, neat rows of the same flower type.

=== Genius loci ===
Designers for Temple Square gardens base their flowering patterns on the genius loci, a Roman term for spirit of place. The technique is explored based on the land art balancing the contribution of natural and ephemeral sculptures to spirit of place. For example, during times of construction or excavation in downtown Salt Lake City, the patterns in the garden change based on the overall tunes of the surrounding environment, ruling out superfluous features. The character of the gardens around the Salt Lake Temple differ from the gardens surrounding the pragmatic aluminum roofs of the Tabernacle or the Gothic Revival architecture of the Salt Lake Assembly Hall.

=== Skeleton, tendon and flesh ===
In order to yield an effective combination of sizes, colors and texture effects, flowers are planted in an organized process called "skeleton, tendon, and flesh". The skeleton consist of a series of core group of flowers or small trees. The tendons link to them are usually drought-resistant shrubs. At Temple Square, flowers make up the flesh to fill the remaining space. Together, the group of plants in the "skeleton" and "tendon" groups make up about 20 percent of the design. About 80 percent of the territory is made up by the "flesh" group of flower, which need simple weed control and little to no water. At certain interchanges, stone becomes "flesh".

=== Piston effect ===
The gardens are frequently arranged by a technique called the "piston effect." Named after the action of the pistons in a car that alternate up and down, the flowers and plants are placed so as to highlight different growth cycles throughout the year. As one group of flowers bloom (pistons up) another group in the same area will be falling away (pistons down). This tends to generate interest at different blooming periods of the region.

== Christmas lights ==
In the early 1960s, E. Earl Hawkes, former Deseret News publisher and general manager of the Hearst Corporation's Record American-Sunday Advertiser in Boston, supported by advertising executive David W. Evans, proposed lighting Temple Square with Christmas lights patterned after the lighting of the Boston Common. Evans and his staff already had been designing dioramas and other materials for the Mormon pavilion at the New York World's Fair and for church visitors' centers associated with temples and historical landmarks.

The LDS Church began displaying Christmas lights around Temple Square in 1965 under the direction of church president David O. McKay. Irvin Nelson, along with his protégé and successor, Peter Lassig, met on several occasions to persuade McKay against the lighting plans. Initially, church electricians were in charge of the lighting project. Church employed gardeners are now in charge of the project every winter.

Evans and his advertising firm designed a Nativity scene, which was built in 1967 between the Tabernacle and the North Visitors' Center. A similar Nativity set is still part of the decorations through the Christmas seasons. The lighting now includes the Temple Square grounds as well as the visitors' centers and the inside of the Tabernacle for the Mormon Tabernacle Choir and other holiday concerts.
