= Alan Feltus =

Alan Feltus is an American figurative artist who paints people in a neoclassical style using warm, earthy-toned colors to depict indoor life scenes frequently including prints, envelopes, and personal correspondence. His paintings have been exhibited in many galleries and museums, including the Hirshhorn Museum and Sculpture Garden, the Arkansas Museum of Fine Arts in Little Rock, National Academy of Design in New York, Oklahoma City Art Museum, and the Wichita Art Museum in Kansas. He has lived and worked in Italy since 1987.
