= Michael Conforti (art historian) =

American art historian (born 1945)

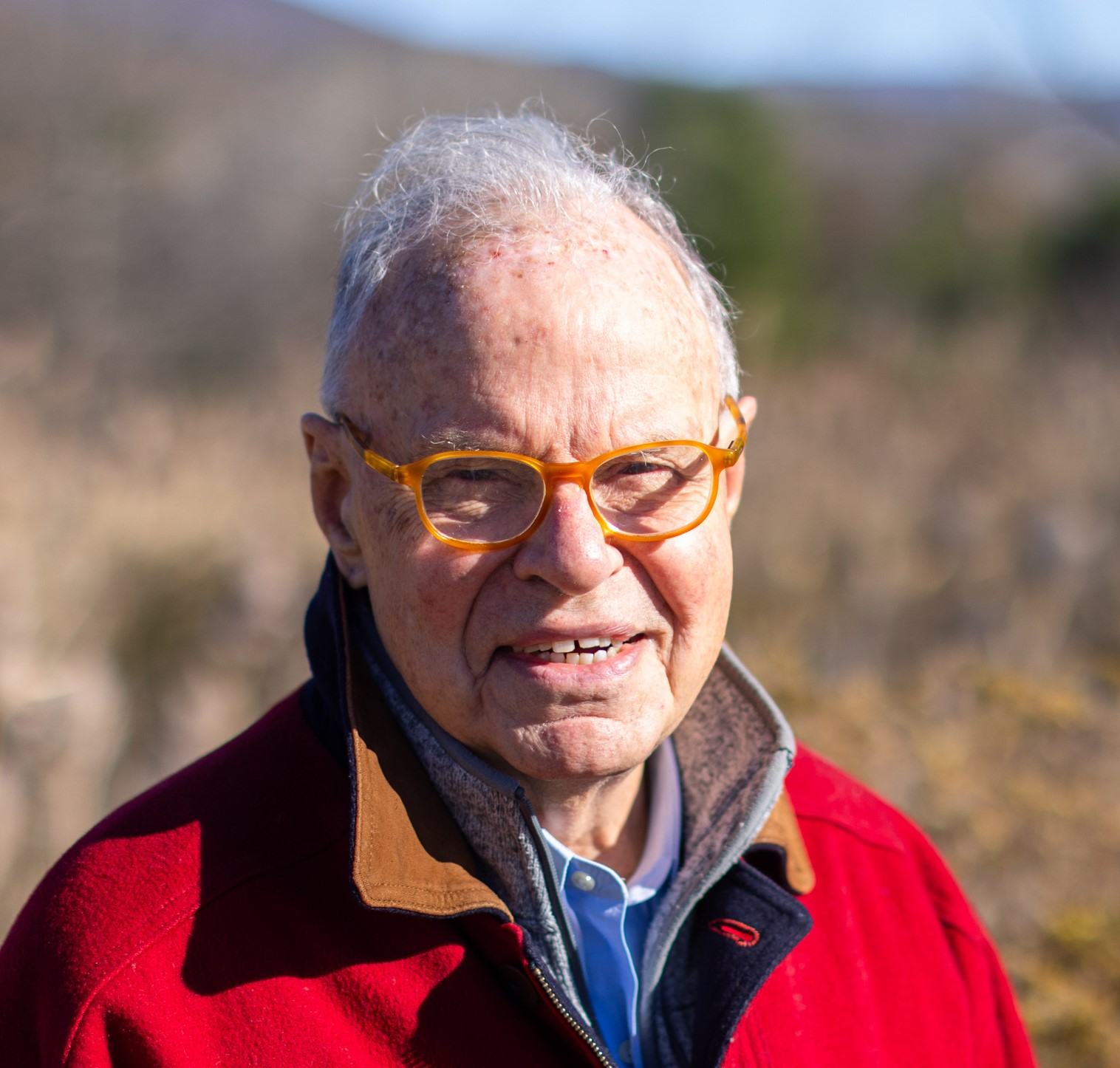
- Conforti in 2024
- Born: 1945 (age 80–81); Haverhill, Massachusetts, US
- Education: Trinity College; Harvard University
- Occupations: Art historian Curator; Museum Director
- Awards: Swedish Order of the Polar Star

Michael Conforti (born 1945) is an American art historian, curator, and museum director. He is Director Emeritus of the Clark Art Institute in Williamstown, Massachusetts. He is a lecturer in the Graduate Program in Art History at Williams College. Conforti served as director of the Clark Art Institute from 1994 to 2015, overseeing major institutional expansion and development initiatives. He is the recipient of Swedish Order of the Polar Star.

== Biography ==
Conforti was born on April 3, 1945, in Haverhill, Massachusetts, and attended the New Hampton School in New Hampshire, graduating in 1964. He earned his B.A. with honors in art history from Trinity College, Hartford, in 1968.

After three years with Sotheby’s in London and New York, he pursued graduate study at Harvard University, receiving his M.A. in 1973 and Ph.D. in 1977 with a dissertation on late baroque sculpture in Rome.

In 1977, after completing his Ph.D., he became Curator of Sculpture and Decorative Arts at the Fine Arts Museums of San Francisco. In 1980 he joined the Minneapolis Institute of Art as Chief Curator and Bell Memorial Curator of Decorative Arts and Sculpture, and served as Interim Director for Art from 1987 to 1988.

In 1994, Conforti was appointed Director of the Clark Art Institute, a position he held until 2015. During his tenure, the Clark introduced a program of self-organized exhibitions from 1996 and established a Research and Academic Program with conferences and long-term fellowships from 1997. He also oversaw a campus expansion project valued at $145 million that added 98,000 square feet of new building space to the Clark’s 140-acre campus. a project designed by the Japanese architect Tadao Ando and the New York based Annabelle Selldorf. He retired as director in 2015 and subsequently continued professional activities through teaching in the Williams College Graduate Program in the History of Art and through board and advisory service. His research interests include the history of museums and collecting, international cultural exchange, and sculpture and decorative arts.

Conforti was president of the Association of Art Museum Directors from 2008 to 2010 and was a trustee and member of the Executive Committee of the American Academy in Rome for over a decade from 1999 to 2013. He also served as a trustee of the Menil Collection in Houston (2015-18) and MASSMoCA (2007-19).

He remains a trustee of the Amon Carter Museum of American Art in Fort Worth, the Canadian Centre for Architecture in Montreal, the (Philip) Guston Foundation and the Worcester Art Museum. He served on the International Advisory Board for the State Hermitage Museum in St. Petersburg (2010-22) and the Forum Wissen at the University of Göttingen (2016-22). He continues as an advisor to the Aspen Institute’s Artist-Endowed Foundation Initiative, the Scuderie al Quirinale in Rome, and is a member of the Board of Directors of the American Friends of the National Gallery in London.

== Personal life ==
Conforti is married to Licia (Peterson) Conforti. They have two children, Peter, who resides outside of Boston with his wife, Abby, and Julia who lives in New York City.

== Awards ==
From 1975 to 1977 Conforti was a Fellow in Art History at the American Academy in Rome, later returning as the Louis I. Kahn Resident in Art History in 2007. He also held fellowships and visiting appointments at the National Gallery of Art’s Center for Advanced Study in the Visual Arts in 1993, the J. Paul Getty Museum from 1988 to 2016, and the Courtauld Institute of Art in 2017.

In 1988 he was awarded Sweden’s Order of the Polar Star for his exhibition Sweden: A Royal Treasury 1500-1700 and the following year the Charles F. Montgomery Exhibition Prize for The American Craftsman and the European Tradition 1620-1820. In 1986 he received the Robert C. Smith Award for his article on the arts and crafts designer John Bradstreet "Orientalism on the Upper Mississippi: The Work of John S. Bradstreet, 1874-1914”, the foundation for his 1994 exhibition “Minnesota 1900: Art and Life on the Upper Mississippi, 1890-1915”.

== Selected bibliography ==
- Conforti, Michael. (1980). Planning the Lateran Apostles. Memoirs of the American Academy in Rome, 35, 243–260.
- "History, Value and the 1990s Art Museum" ,Papers of the XXCVIII Internationaler Kongress für Kunstgeschichte, Berlin, 15-20 July, 1992, Berlin, 1993. pp. 3-14.
- Conforti, Michael (1995-01-01). "Museums past and museums present: Some thoughts on institutional survival". Museum Management and Curatorship. doi:10.1080/09647779509515454.
- Conforti, Michael. (1997). Les musées des arts appliqués et l’histoire de l’art. In E. Pommier (Ed.), Histoire de l’histoire de l’art (Vol. 2, 18th and 19th centuries, pp. 327–347). Musée du Louvre.
- Conforti, Michael (2020). "Dream a Different Dream of Cultural Exchange". Curator: The Museum Journal. 63 (1): 15–19. doi:10.1111/cura.12347. ISSN 0011-3069.
- Conforti, Michael, ed. (2021). "Tadao Ando's Public Projects in the United States". Tadao Ando and Le Corbusier. Chicago, Wrightwood 659: Alphawood Foundation. pp. 11–57.
- Conforti, Michael (2019-06-13). "LACMA is building an institution for the 21st century". The Art Newspaper - International art news and events.
- Conforti, Michael (2024-08-26). Meet Michael Conforti ’64: Art Historian, Museum Director, and Lifelong Creative New Hampton School. Retrieved 2026-02-15.
