= Denis J. M. Bradley =

American philosopher (born 1943)

Denis Bradley
- Born: 1943 (age 82–83)

Education
- Education: University of Toronto (PhD), University of Chicago (MA)

Philosophical work
- Era: 21st-century philosophy
- Region: Western philosophy
- Institutions: Georgetown University

Denis Bradley (born 1943) is an American philosopher and Professor Emeritus of Philosophy at Georgetown University. He is a fellow of the American Academy in Rome and is known for his works on Aquinas.

== Books ==
- Aquinas on the Twofold Human Good: Reason and Human Happiness in Aquinas’s Moral Science, The Catholic University of America Press 1997
