= Caroline Bruzelius =

American historian

Caroline Astrid Bruzelius is an American art historian and expert in medieval architecture. She is the Anne M. Cogan Professor of Art and Art History at Duke University. In 2020 she was elected to the American Philosophical Society.

== Life and career ==
Bruzelius was born in Stockholm, Sweden on April 18, 1949, to Axel Sture Bruzelius and Constance (Brickett) Brereton. She emigrated to the United States in 1965.

Bruzelius completed her undergraduate work at Wellesley College in 1971 and received an M.A. in art, an M.Phil., and a Ph.D., all from Yale University in 1973, 1974, and 1977, respectively.

From 1977 to 1979, Bruzelius was an assistant professor at Dickinson College in Carlisle, Pennsylvania, and from 1979 to 1980 she was a researcher at the National Endowment for the Humanities. In 1980 she became an assistant professor at Harvard University, on a Mellon fellowship, a position she held until 1981. The following year, in 1982, she became a Mellon Fellow and an assistant professor at Duke University in Durham, North Carolina, where she became an associate professor in 1986, and the Chairman of the Art Department from 1989 to 1993. She became a full professor at Duke in 1991, and held that position until 2018. From 1994 to 1998 she was on a leave of absence from Duke University to serve as the Director of the American Academy in Rome. She was awarded the Anne M. Cogan Professor of Art and Art History at Duke in 2001.

== Partial bibliography ==
- With William Tronzo: "Medieval Naples: An Architectural & Urban History. 400–1400." New York: Italica Press, 2011.
- The Stones of Naples: Church Building in the Angevin Kingdom, 1266-1343. Yale University Press, London, (January, 2004). (in Italian as: Le Pietre di Napoli, 2005).
- Francesco Aceto and Alessandra Periccioli-Saggese. Campania Gotica. Jaca Books, Milan, (2006).
- "The Architectural Context of Santa Maria Donna Regina." The Church of Sta. Maria Donna Regina: Art, Iconography and Patronage in Fourteenth-Century Naples. Edited by Janis Elliott and Cordelia Warr. (2004): 79–92.
- With C. Goodson: "The Abbey in the Middle Ages." Walls and Memory. The Abbey of San Sebastiano at Alatri (Lazio) from Late Roman Monastery to Renaissance Villa and Beyond. Edited by Elizabeth Fentress, Caroline J. Goodson, Margaret L. Laird and Stephanie C. Leone. (2005): 72–113.
- '"Le pietre sono parole." Charles II d'Anjou, Filippo Minutolo e la Cathedrale Angevine de Naples. [sic] Le monde des cathedrales, Paris Editions du Louvre (2004)
