= Ryn Dean =

American singer and songwriter

- Born: January 5, 1996 (age 30); San Diego, California, United States
- Occupations: Singer, songwriter
- Years active: 2012–present

Ryn Dean (born January 5, 1996) is an American singer and songwriter. She is known to have several songs from soundtracks of Brazilian soap operas of Rede Globo, like Alto Astral, Malhação Sonhos, The Rules of the Game and Malhação Seu Lugar no Mundo.

== Biography ==
Ryn Dean is an American singer who became known in Brazil for having songs on the soundtracks of Rede Globo soap operas. She was born in San Diego, California. She began to sing and play as a child, but only started writing songs in 2012. She admires the singers Adele, Bruno Mars, Maroon 5 and Sam Smith. "I would love to tour with them because they write their own songs and his love and passion for music is evident in every performance." In 2014 international doors opened for the singer when she had the song "I Told You So" included in the track Malhação 2014/2015 (Malhação Dreams), the single was the theme song of the Snake character (Felipe Simas ) and Jade (Ana Julia Durigon) In 2015 she had the song "City Of Angels" included on the soundtrack of Malhação Your Place in the World, theme Ciça (Julia Konrad), and ( "Be My Sin") included in the soundtrack of The Rules of the Game, theme Belisa (Bruna Linzmeyer). She has done songs with producers who have worked with Christina Aguilera, Bruce Springsteen, The Mars Volta, At The Drive-In and Counting Crows. In the United States their songs are played on several radio stations and their songs are featured on television, films and compilations for example in US NBC.

She describes herself as a pop artist alternative because she has influences from pop, rock and folk music. Her first single was "I'll Show You Crazy" which was widely praised by critics. Her first album was "The Hit Lights released in 2015 by the label Magnetic Red Records. "Be My Sin" which was novel trail Globo Game Rule was the first single from the first EP and stayed for 12 weeks on Top 40 Indicator Charts, "I Told You So" has surpassed 10 million views on YouTube and other singles have more than 1 million views on the video site.

The singer came to Brazil in 2015 because she has many fans in Brazil and even already has a stake in Malhação Dreams in when she was in Brazil. In September this year she will make a great show in São Paulo, she is inspired by the singer Adele. In one of her stops in Brazil she gave an interview to Ana Julia Durigon actress and sang at the meeting of the Stage With Fátima Bernardes.

According to the website BreakTudo in 2016, she lived in Los Angeles in the United States and was preparing a tour. It announced on Facebook that on September 30, 2016 it would be in Brazil to make a show in São Paulo. Its music album "Hit The Lights" is available in streaming platforms: Spotify, Deezer, iTunes and MP3 Amazon and also on YouTube. Ryn has profiles on social networks all checked in Instagram, Twitter and Spotify to ensure the reliability of their identity. Ryn Dean is made a US tour before coming to Brazil which included Hartford, Phoenix in Arizona, San Diego, California, Oakland, Santa Barbara and on September 7, she was to perform at the Gramercy Theatre in New York.

== Discography ==
- "Hit The Lights" (2015)

=== Singles ===
- Be My Sin (2015)
- I Told You So
- City Of Angels
- So Undeniable
- Tired Eyes, Tired lies
- A Letter To You
- I'll Show You Crazy
- Love You Forever And a Day
- Rhythm And Booze
