= Julie Bargmann =

American landscape architect

- Born: 1958 (age 67–68); Bergen County, New Jersey, United States
- Education: Carnegie Mellon University; Harvard University
- Occupation: Architect
- Parent(s): James F. Bargmann (father); Alice Badenhope (mother)
- Practice: D.I.R.T. Studio
- Website: dirtstudio.com

Julie Bargmann (born 1958) is an American landscape architect and educator. Bargmann is Professor Emerita of Landscape Architecture at the University of Virginia School of Architecture, founding principal of D.I.R.T. (Dump It Right There) Studio, a landscape architecture firm, and inaugural recipient of the Cornelia Hahn Oberlander International Landscape Architecture Prize, an initiative of Washington, D.C.–based The Cultural Landscape Foundation.

== Career ==
Bargmann was born at Holy Name hospital, in Teaneck, New Jersey, to James F. Bargmann, a sales executive for Owens-Illinois (now O-I Glass), a producer of glass and plastic containers; and Alice Jane Badenhope, a homemaker and 1947 graduate of the University of Toledo. Bargmann was the sixth of eight children. She received a Bachelor of Fine Arts in Sculpture from Carnegie Mellon University and a Master in Landscape Architecture from the Harvard University Graduate School of Design in 1987, where she was a classmate of Anita Berrizbeitia.

After graduating from Harvard, Bargmann worked alongside Michael Van Valkenburgh, while also teaching at the University of Minnesota. In 1992, Bargmann founded D.I.R.T (Dump It Right There), a landscape design studio based in Charlottesville, Virginia, with the mission to turn “ugly duckling” sites—meaning, polluted industrial land—into productive, habitable landscapes with a distinctive aesthetic. Her work included repurposing former landfill sites into public spaces such as parks and playgrounds. Shortly thereafter, Bargmann accepted a position at the University of Virginia School of Architecture, while continuing to run D.I.R.T. Studio

In 1998, Bargmann became a contributing editor to the Landscape Journal, published by the University of Wisconsin Press.

In 2021, Bargmann delivered the annual Daniel Urban Kiley Lecture at the Harvard University Graduate School of Design.

== Projects ==
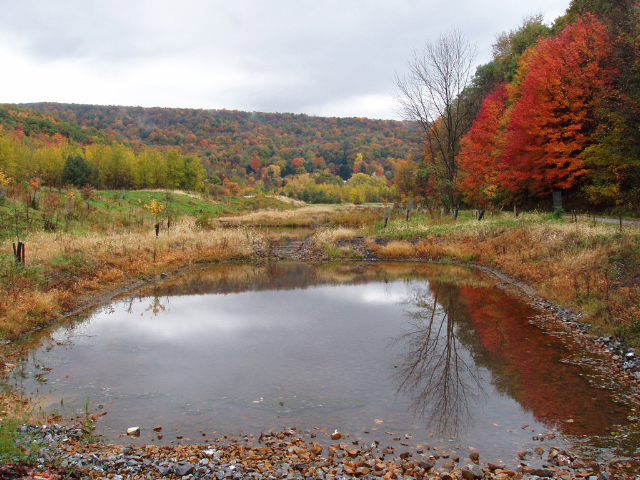
A view of Bargmann's collaborative Vintondale Reclamation Park project.

Bargmann was one of four on the Design Team, which included Dr. T Allan Comp, Founder/Director and historian, Robert Deason, hydrogeologist, and Stacy Levy, sculptor. Working with the community and multiple agencies, the project transformed 35 acres into an acid mine drainage treatment system, wetland habitat and both active and passive recreation areas, winning multiple awards. See AMDandART.info for more information.

In 2000, Bargmann and architect William McDonough collaborated on a landscape plan using phytoremediation and other means to address the heavily polluted Ford Motor Corporation plant in Dearborn, Michigan, a $2 billion project.

A decade later, Urban Outfitters (URBN) president and CEO Richard Hayne, hired Bargmann to create a campus to physically unify the company's various brands in the Philadelphia Navy Yard. According to the American Society of Landscape Architects (ASLA), which recognized the project with a prestigious Honor Award in 2014, “D.I.R.T. Studio artfully integrated recycled concrete, bricks, and rusted metal found onsite…creating a rich, layered environment that demonstrates sustainable values.” The ASLA lauded Bargmann for successfully lobbying to make the landscape accessible to the public. “On the civic axis to the Delaware River, URBN’s private venture becomes an extension of the public realm of Philadelphia and a well-dressed poster child for industrial redevelopment,” the ASLA noted. As part of the land, it included a working United States Navy base.

Bargmann's recent and ongoing work (as of this time in August 2023) includes innovative projects with architect Marlon Blackwell in Fort Worth, Texas, and with developer Philip Kafka's firm Prince Concepts in Detroit. There, she has designed the landscape of the Core City urban neighborhood, including a parking lot with the emphasis on “park.”

== Honors ==
- Fellow of the American Academy in Rome for Landscape Architecture (1990)
- National Design Awards for Environmental Design (2001)
- University of Wisconsin–Milwaukee Urban Edge Award (2007)
- United States Artists Fellow (2008)
- Cornelia Hahn Oberlander International Landscape Architecture Prize, awarded by The Cultural Landscape Foundation (2021)

== See also ==
- List of fellows of the American Academy in Rome (1971–1990)
