= Franklin D. Israel =

American architect

Franklin David Israel (born December 2, 1945, in Brooklyn, New York — d. June 10, 1996, in Los Angeles, California) was an American architect best known for his designs for private residences and offices for film production companies in Los Angeles. He was a member of the L.A. Ten, "a loosely affiliated cadre of architects" working in Los Angeles during the 1980s and 1990s.

== Education ==
Israel began studying philosophy at the University of Pennsylvania, but was drawn to architecture and switched to studying with renowned architect Louis Kahn. He did postgraduate work at Yale University and then received his master of architecture from Columbia University.

== Awards & honors ==
- 1975 Rome Prize for architecture

== Selected works ==
Name	City	US State/ Country	Completed	Other Information	Image
Snell House	Amagansett	New York	1972		
Clark House	Hollywood	California	1980		
Bellisle Ranch House	Hollywood	California	1980		
Joel Grey House	Brentwood	California	1980		
West Hollywood Club	West Hollywood	California	1982		
Caprice Boutique	Hollywood	California	1984		
Arrow House	Lake Arrowhead	California	1984		
Honey Sprints Country Club	Lake Arrowhead	California	1984	interiors	
Kiefer House	Bel Air	California	1984		
Krost House	Los Angeles	California	1984	remodel	
Palette Restaurant	Los Angeles	California	1984		
Barry Miller Offic	Los Angeles	California	1985		
Cassidy Cabin	Frazier Park	California	1985		
Cedar Sinai Medical Office Towers	Los Angeles	California	1985		
Certified Coatings Products Co.	Los Angeles	California	1985		
Comegys House	Bel Air	California	1984		
Stein House	Los Angeles	California	1985		
Forman/Hyde House	Los Angeles	California	1985		
Frischer House	Venice	California	1986		
Kurfirst Apartment	New York	New York	1986		
Lerner/Wilder/La Brea	Los Angeles	California	1986		
John Rich House	Bevery Hills	California	1986		
Schrager/Rubell Hotel	New York	New York	1986		
Andrea Rich Apartment	Westwood	California	1987		
Andrea Rich Beach House	Hermosa Beach	California	1987		
Andrea Rich Apartment	Westwood	California	1987		
Bombyk House	Los Angeles	California	1987		
Hard Rock Hotel	Las Vegas	Nevada	1987		
Harris House	Los Angeles	California	1987		
Simon House	Los Angeles	California	1987		
UCLA Installation	Los Angeles	California	1987		
Harris House	Los Angeles	California	1987		
Altman Condominium	Malibu	California	1988		
Gem Advertising	Santa Monica	California	1988		
Israel House	Santa Monica	California	1988		
Klein House	Bel Air	California	1988		
Lamy-Newton House	Hancock Park	California	1988		
Le Vasseur House	Laguna Beach	California	1988		
Little House	Studio City	California	1988		
Lowell House	New York	New York	1988		
Mid-Atlantic Toyota	Glen Burnie	Maryland	1988		
Propaganda Films	Hollywood	California	1988		
Weisman Center	Venice	California	1988		
West Hollywood Civic Center	West Hollywood	California	1988	competition	
Swid-Powell			1988	dinnerware design	
Arango-Berry House	Beverly Hills	California	1989		
Cemetery Gateway at Crystal Cathedral	London	England	1989		
Fonda House	Santa Monica	California	1989		
Gerber House	Westwood	California	1989		
Graham House	Los Angeles	California	1989		
Holliman House	Studio City	California	1989		
Hamori House	Los Angeles	California	1989	see also Bombyk House	
Roberts House	Hollywood	California	1989		
Rodeo Drive Hair Salon	Beverly Hills	California	1989		
Borman House, interiors	Malibu	California	1990	Frank Gehry, original architect	
Jesse Jackson Show	Washington DC	United States	1990		
Fiskin-Worrel House	Los Angeles	California	1990		
Bright & Associates Office Building	Venice	California	1991		
Divine Design Pavilion	Santa Monica	California	1991		
Goldberg-Bean House	Hollywood	California	1991		
Isenberg House	Montecito	California	1991		
Kaplan House	Malibu	California	1991		
Limelight Productions	Los Angeles	California	1991		
Mason House, interiors	Venice	California	1991		
Morton House	Los Angeles	California	1991		
The New England Holocaust Memorial	Boston	Massachusetts	1991		
Raznick House	Hollywood Hills	California	1991		
Speedway Cafe	Venice	California	1991		
Tesh House	Mar Vista	California	1991		
Tisch-Avent House	Culver City	California	1991		
Titch Pleasance collection			1991	jewelry design	
Tesh House	Mar Vista	California	1991		
UCLA Southern Regional Library	Los Angeles	California	1991		
Virgin Records	Beverly Hills	California	1991		
Weisman Pavilion	Beverly Hills	California	1991		
Baldwin House	Venice	California	1992		
Brevard Sunset Studio	Venice	California	1992		
Bunka Shutter and the New Industrial City	Tokyo	Japan	1992		
Drager House	Berkeley	California	1992		
Hague House	The Hague	Netherlands	1992		
Furniture for Pacific Art & Design	Venince	California	1992	furniture design services	
Spartan House	The Hague	Netherlands	1992		
Steinberg House	Beverly Hills	California	1992		
Woo Pavilion	Silverlake	California	1992		
U.S. Animation	Los Angeles	California	1992		
903 Colorado	Santa Monica	California	1993		
Belldegrun House	Brentwood	California	1993		
Dan House	Malibu	California	1993		
Getty Villa competition	Pacific Palisades	California	1993	competition	
Gold House	Bel Air	California	1993		
Kohler bathroom			1993		
Pittard Sullivan Fitzgerald	Venice	California	1993		
Stanford Mechanical and Civil Engineering redevelopment	Palo Alto	California	1993		
UCLA Psychiatric Research Facility	Los Angeles	California	1993		
Goodman & Associates tenant improvements	Los Angeles	California	1994		
Hochberg-Healy House	Miami Beach	Florida	1994		
Friedland House	Jupiter	Florida	1994		
UC Riverside Fine Arts Building	Riverside	California	1994		
Alexander-Henry Fabrics			1995		
Alfred Sole Office Garage	Los Angeles	California	1995		
Arkush House	Studio City	California	1995		
Garfield House	Studio City	California	1995		
Los Angeles County Museum of Art (LACMA) Office for Andrea Rich	Los Angeles	California	1995		
Rebel Entertainment	Los Angeles	California	1995		
Strick House	Los Angeles	California	1995		
WSE Production tenant improvements	Los Angeles	California	1995		

== Archives ==
The Getty Research Institute houses the Franklin D. Israel papers, 1967-1996. An archival collection consisting of project drawings and records, with the bulk of the material being architectural projects from the late-1980s to the mid-1990s; documents from his professional career; and a small series of personal papers.
