= Marc Balet =

American art director (born 1948)

Marc Balet (born 1948) is an American creative and art director, architect, and the former art director of Interview Magazine.

He graduated from RISD in Providence, Rhode Island with a degree in architecture. In 1975, at the age of 32, he was awarded a Prix de Rome in architecture. The Whitney Museum of American Art held a solo exhibition of his work titled Dream Houses.

Balet was the art director of Andy Warhol's Interview Magazine from 1976 until 1987. He was the creative director of Be-Spoke in 2023 and Kenny Scharf in 2009.

He went on to found his own advertising agency (mbg.nyc) whose clients have included Anne Klein, Barney's, and Giorgio Armani. In 2015 Balet launched Ouihours an "online magazine and e-commerce site devoted entirely to luxury intimates".

Balet's work has been shown at different locations throughout the world. These include the Institute of Contemporary Arts in London, the MoMA PS1, the Whitney Museum of American Art, New York University's Grey Art Gallery and others.

Balet also worked on fashion publications. These include Vouge Patterns, Mirabella, Detour, Fame, and Connoisseur.

== Film ==
Balet has served as a creative consultant on Netflix's 2021 series Pretend It's a City. He was also involved in the 2010 HBO documentary Public Speaking and Miss Gabby, a Derek Jarman production.

Balet was interviewed on screen in the Netflix docuseries The Andy Warhol Diaries in which he notably called former Interview editor Bob Colacello an "asshole" for having put then United States First Lady Nancy Reagan on the cover of the magazine.
