= Laurie Olin =

American landscape architect (born 1938)

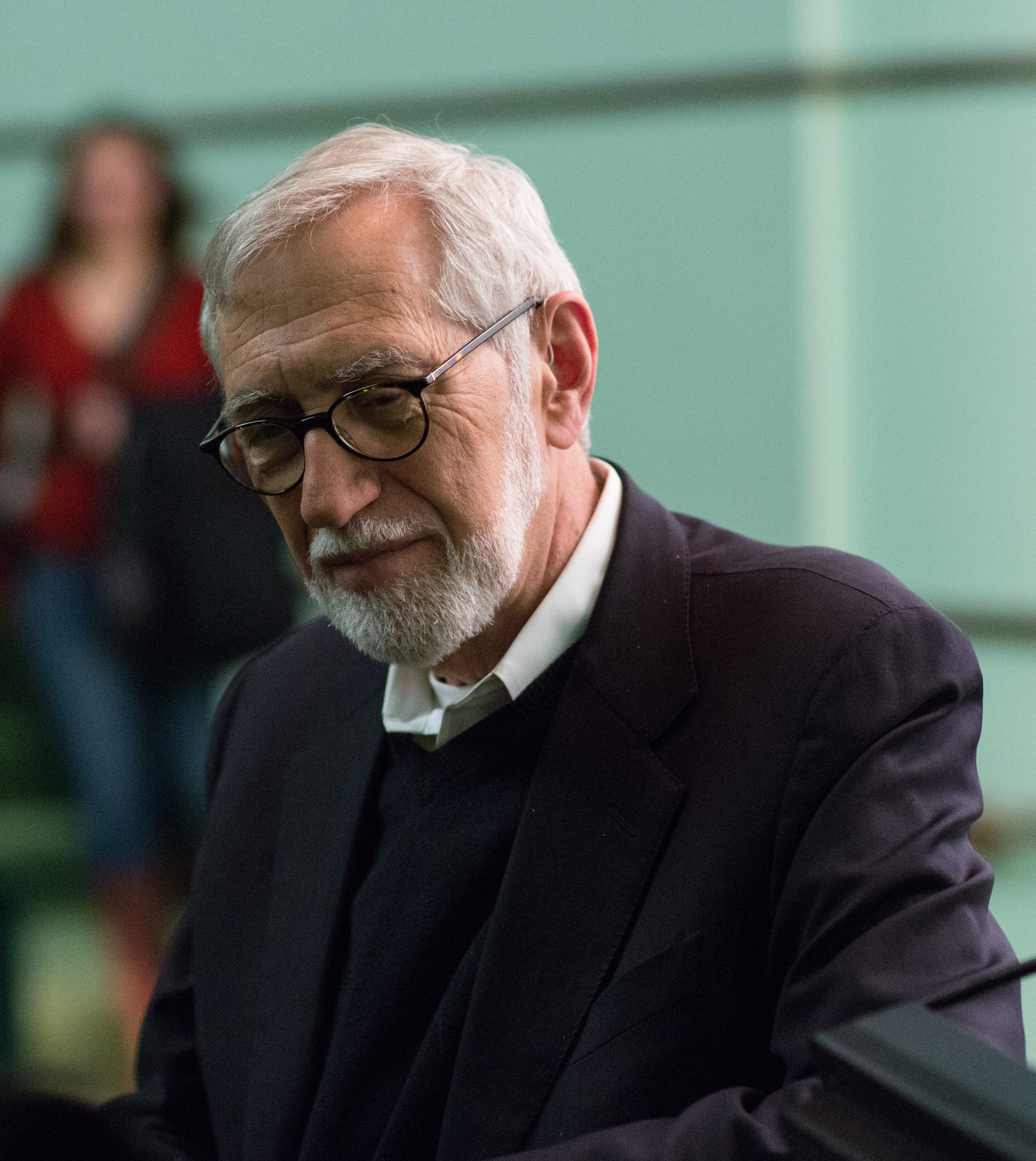
- Born: 12 October 1938 (age 87); Marshfield, Wisconsin
- Education: University of Washington
- Occupation: Architect
- Awards: National Medal of Arts - 2012 Thomas Jefferson Medal in Architecture - 2013
- Practice: The Olin Studio
- Design: Landscape architecture

Laurie Olin (born 1938, Marshfield, Wisconsin) is an American landscape architect. He has worked on landscape design projects at diverse scales, from private residential gardens to public parks and corporate/museum campus plans.

== Early life ==
Olin grew up in Alaska, and earned his degree in Architecture from the University of Washington in Seattle, where he was mentored under Richard Haag.

== Career ==
After graduating he worked for offices in Seattle, New York City, and London. In 1976 he became a professor for the University of Pennsylvania, where he offered courses on the design of environments. In 1986 he became head chair of the landscape architecture program at Harvard University. After serving as chair at Harvard, Olin returned to University of Pennsylvania where he continues to be Practice Professor of Landscape Architecture.

=== Founding OLIN ===
Olin is the founding partner of the landscape architecture and urban design firm OLIN, formerly Olin Partnership. The firm received the Cooper-Hewitt National Design Award for Landscape Design in 2008, and in 2010 was on the winning team in the competition to design the new United States Embassy in London with architects KieranTimberlake.

=== Writing ===
Olin has written widely on the history and theory of architecture and landscape, receiving the Bradford Williams medal for best writing on Landscape Architecture. Olin co-authored La Foce: A Garden and Landscape in Tuscany, which includes a historical essay, along with photographs, sketches, and a critical analysis of the early 20th-century garden in Italy. Across the Open Field (2000), is both a memoir and series of essays on the evolution of the English landscape. He is also the author of Transforming the Commonplace (1996) and Vizcaya: An American Villa and Its Makers (2006, with Witold Rybczynski), on James Deering's mansion in Coconut Grove, Florida.

=== Awards and honors ===
Olin is a Guggenheim Fellow, an American Academy of Rome Fellow, a Fellow of the American Society of Landscape Architects (ASLA), an honorary member of the American Institute of Architects (AIA), a Fellow of the American Academy of Arts and Sciences, the 1999 Wyck-Strickland Award recipient. Olin won the Rome Prize in Landscape Architecture in 1972, was the recipient of the 1998 Award in Architecture from the American Academy of Arts and Letters, and was recently inducted into the American Academy of Arts and Letters.

Olin was a speaker in the Spotlight on Design Lecture Series at the National Building Museum in 2003. In 1994 he was elected into the National Academy of Design. In 2012 he was presented with the prestigious National Medal of Arts by President Obama. Awarded by the National Endowment for the Arts, it is the highest honor given to artists by the US Government.

== Notable projects ==
=== Europe ===
- Bishopsgate, London, England
- Brancusi Ensemble, Târgu Jiu, Romania
- Memorial to the Murdered Jews of Europe, Berlin, Germany (with architect Peter Eisenman)
- Westferry Circus, London, England

=== United States ===
- Apple Park, Cupertino, California
- Director Park, Portland, Oregon
- 1 Memorial Drive, campus of the headquarters of the Federal Reserve Bank of Kansas City
- ARCO corporate headquarters, La Palma, California
- Battery Park City, Manhattan, New York
- Bryant Park, Manhattan, New York
- Columbus Circle, Manhattan, New York
- Getty Center, Brentwood, Los Angeles, California
- Hudson Yards Redevelopment Project, Manhattan, New York
- Mill River Park & Greenway, Stamford, Connecticut
- Pacific Park, open space around development, Brooklyn, New York
- Pershing Square, Los Angeles, California
- Robert F. Wagner Park, New York
- University of Pennsylvania, Philadelphia, Pennsylvania (Campus Development Plan)
- Washington Monument, Washington, DC
- Toledo Museum of Art, Toledo, Ohio
- National Gallery of Art Sculpture Garden, Washington, DC
- LDS Conference Center roof ambient, part of The Gardens at Temple Square, Salt Lake City, Utah

== Awards ==
- ASLA Merit Award, ARCO Research Center, 1984
- Progressive Architecture Magazine Design Award, Battery Park City, 1985
- Urban Landscape Institute Award for Excellence for Public Projects, Bryant Park, 1996
- ASLA Landmark Award, Battery Park City, 2003
- ASLA Design Honor Award, the J. Paul Getty Center, 2003
- ASLA Award of Excellence, The Heart of the Park at Hermann Park, 2005
- Mid-Atlantic Construction Magazine Park/Landscape Award of Merit, the Washington Monument, 2005
- AIA Honor Award for Regional and Urban Design, the University of British Columbia, 2006
- ASLA Landscape Architecture Firm Award (awarded to OLIN firm), 2006
- ASLA General Design Award of Honor, Columbus Circle, 2006
- Royal Architectural Institute of Canada Urban Design Award, the University of British Columbia, 2006
- ASLA General Design Award Of Honor, the Washington Monument, 2008
- Cooper-Hewitt National Design Award (awarded to OLIN firm), 2008
- Urban Land Institute Award of Excellence, Comcast Building (awarded to OLIN firm), 2009
- Building Institute's Bybee Prize, 2010
- ASLA Landmark Award, Bryant Park (awarded to OLIN firm), 2010
- ASLA Medal, 2011
- National Medal of Arts, 2012
- Thomas Jefferson Medal in Architecture, 2013
- Vincent Scully Prize, 2017

== Publications ==
- France Sketchbooks, 2020. Edited by Laurie Olin and Pablo Mandel ISBN 978-1943532575
- Be Seated, 2018. ISBN 978-1939621726
- OLIN: Placemaking, 2008. ISBN 978-1580932103
- Vizcaya: An American Villa and its Members, with Witold Rybczynski, 2007. ISBN 978-0812239515
- La Foce: A Garden and Landscape in Tuscany, with Benedetta Origo et al., 2001. ISBN 978-0812235937
- Across the Open Field: Essays Drawn from English Landscapes, 2000. ISBN 978-0812235319
- Transforming the Common Place: Selections from Laurie Olin's Sketchbook, 1996.
- Breath on the Mirror: Seattle's Skid Road Community, 1973.
