= List of Guggenheim Fellowships awarded in 2006 =

List of Guggenheim Fellowships awarded in 2006 contains all Guggenheim Fellowships awarded in the year 2006, with the information broken down numerically and by region.

== U.S. and Canadian Fellows ==
=== A ===
- Kathryn Alexander, Composer, New Haven, Connecticut; Associate Professor of Music Composition, Yale University: Music composition.
- Cristian Amigo, Composer, Astoria, New York; Visiting Scholar, Center for Latin American and Caribbean Studies, New York University; Adjunct Professor, College of Staten Island, City University of New York: Music composition.
- Olive Ayhens, Artist, Brooklyn, New York: Painting.

=== B ===
- Markus Baenziger, Artist, New York City; Assistant Professor of Fine Arts, Brandeis University: Sculpture.
- Ulrich Baer, Associate Professor of German and Comparative Literature and Chair, Department of German, New York University: The representation of clouds and the art of sublimation, 1800–1970.
- Dare Baldwin, Professor of Psychology, University of Oregon: Understanding others' actions.
- Thomas J. Barfield, Professor of Anthropology and Chair, Department of Anthropology, Boston University: Political legitimacy in Afghanistan.
- Catherine Barnett, Poet, New York City; Adjunct Faculty, Creative Writing Program, and Liberal Arts Program, Paul McGhee Division, New York University: Poetry.
- Emily Barton, Writer, Brooklyn, New York; Writer-in-Residence, Eugene Lang College, New School University: Fiction.a
- Todd Bertolaet, Professor of Photography, Florida A & M University: Photography.
- Douglas Biow, Professor of Italian and Comparative Literature, University of Texas, Austin: Anticonformist authors in 16th-century Italy.
- Michael R. Blatt, Regius Professor of Botany and Head of Plant Sciences, University of Glasgow: Membrane protein mobility and dynamics.
- Judy Blunt, Associate Professor of Creative Writing and Nonfiction, University of Montana: Essays on the legend of the strong Western woman.
- Hilary Brace, Artist, Santa Barbara, California: Drawing.
- Marco Breuer, Photographer, Hudson, New York; Adjunct Faculty Member in Photography, M.F.A. Program, Bard College: Photography.
- Ellen Bromberg, Choreographer, Salt Lake City, Utah; Associate Professor of Modern Dance, University of Utah: Choreography.
- Timothy Brook, Professor of Chinese History and Principal, St. John's College, University of British Columbia: Social suffering and social policy in the Chinese tradition.
- Roxane Butterfly, Choreographer, New York City; Artistic Director, Worldbeats: Choreography.

=== C ===
- Christopher Caines, Choreographer, Brooklyn, New York; Artistic Director, Christopher Caines Dance Company: Choreography.
- Scott Cairns, Poet, Columbia, Missouri; Professor of English, University of Missouri: Poetry.
- Wally Cardona, Choreographer, Brooklyn, New York; Artistic Director, WCV, Inc: Choreography.
- Bruce G. Carruthers, Professor of Sociology, Northwestern University: The evolution of economic trust.
- Alessandra Casella, Professor of Economics, Columbia University: Storable votes.
- David W. Christianson, Roy and Diana Vagelos Professor in Chemistry and Chemical Biology, University of Pennsylvania: Complexes between biological macromolecules and nonbiological nanomolecules.
- Jill Ciment, Writer, Gainesville, Florida; Professor of English, University of Florida: Fiction.
- Paul M. Cobb, Associate Professor of Islamic History, and Fellow of the Medieval Institute, University of Notre Dame: Usama ibn Munqidh's memoirs and the Muslims in the age of the Crusades.
- Patricia Cline Cohen, Professor of History, University of California, Santa Barbara: Thomas and Mary Gove Nichols and marriage reform in antebellum America.
- Donald Crockett, Composer, La Cañada, California; Professor of Composition and Chair, Composition Department, Thornton School of Music, University of Southern California: Music composition.

=== D ===
- Tracy Daugherty, Professor of English, Oregon State University: A biography of Donald Barthelme.
- Anthony Davis, Composer, San Diego, California; Professor of Music, University of California, San Diego: Music composition.
- Sally Denton, Writer, Santa Fe, New Mexico: Jessie and John Frémont and the shaping of America.
- Dennis Des Chene, Professor of Philosophy, Washington University: Wisdom and the new science in the 17th century.
- Nathaniel Deutsch, Associate Professor of Religion, Swarthmore College: Ansky and the invention of Jewish ethnography.
- Helen DeWitt, Writer, Berlin, Germany: Fiction.
- Michael Dine, Professor of Physics, University of California, Santa Cruz: Preparation for the large hadron collider.
- Frank Dobbin, Professor of Sociology, Harvard University: Equal opportunity in practice.
- Julia V. Douthwaite, Professor of French and Assistant Provost for International Studies, University of Notre Dame: A literary history of the French Revolution.
- Michael W. Doyle, Harold Brown Professor of International Affairs, Law, and Political Science, Columbia University: The ethics, politics, and law of preventative self-defense.
- Paul Dresher, Composer, Berkeley, California: Music composition.
- Jean-Marie Dufour, Professor of Economics and Canada Research Chair in Econometrics, University of Montréal: Econometric problems in macroeconomics and finance.

=== E ===
- Robert Edelman, Professor of History, University of California, San Diego: Moscow soccer audiences and popular attitudes toward communism.
- Michael S. Engel, Professor and Senior Curator, Division of Entomology, Natural History Museum, and Department of Ecology and Evolutionary Biology, University of Kansas: Evolution of the termites and global changes in carbon recycling.
- Martín Espada, Poet, Amherst, Massachusetts; Professor of English, University of Massachusetts: Poetry.

=== F ===
- Hany Farid, Associate Professor of Computer Science, Dartmouth College: Digital forensics.
- Paula S. Fass, Margaret Byrne Professor of History, University of California, Berkeley: Parents and children in American history, 1800-2000.
- Gillian Feeley-Harnik, Kathleen Gough Collegiate Professor of Anthropology, University of Michigan: Kinship and ecology in 19th-century Great Britain and America.
- Steven Feierman, Professor of History and Sociology of Science, University of Pennsylvania: Social medicine in Africa.
- Martha Feldman, Professor of Music and the Humanities, University of Chicago: The castrato as myth.
- Peter Fend, Artist, Berlin, Germany: Visual art.
- Judy Fox, Artist, New York City: Sculpture.
- Dana Frankfort, Artist, Long Island City, New York: Painting.
- Daisy Fried, Poet, Northampton, Massachusetts; Grace Hazard Conkling Writer-in-Residence, Smith College: Poetry.
- Barbara Fuchs, Associate Professor of Romance Languages, University of Pennsylvania: "Moorish" culture and the conflictive construction of Spain.
- Diana Fuss, Professor of English, Princeton University: Poetry and the art of resuscitation.

=== G ===
- Louis Galambos, Professor of History, The Johns Hopkins University; Editor, The Papers of Dwight David Eisenhower; Maguire Chair, Kluge Center, Library of Congress: The Creative Society, and the price Americans paid for being creative.
- Alison P. Galvani, Assistant Professor of Epidemiology and Public Health, Yale University: Game-theoretic insights into population adherence of influenza vaccination policies.
- David Garland, Arthur T. Vanderbilt Professor of Law and Professor of Sociology, New York University: Capital punishment and American society.
- Nina Rattner Gelbart, Professor of History and Anita Johnson Wand Professor of Women's Studies, Occidental College: Frenchwomen of science in the 18th century.
- Michael Gitlin, Film Maker, Brooklyn, New York; Assistant Professor of Film and Media Studies, Hunter College, City University of New York: Film making.
- Jane M. Gitschier, Professor of Medicine and Pediatrics, University of California, San Francisco: The genetic basis of absolute-pitch perception.
- Arthur Goldhammer, Translator, Cambridge, Massachusetts; Senior Affiliate, Center for European Studies, Harvard University: Democracy in America since Tocqueville.
- Rebecca Newberger Goldstein, Writer, Cambridge, Massachusetts; Visiting Professor of Philosophy, Trinity College: Fiction.
- Maria Elena González, Artist, Brooklyn, New York: Sculpture and installation art.
- Dena Goodman, Professor of History and Women's Studies, University of Michigan: Women's letter-writing in the 18th century.
- Katie Grinnan, Artist, Los Angeles; Lecturer, University of California, Irvine: Sculpture.
- Rinne Groff, Playwright, New York City; Instructor in Dramatic Writing, Tisch School of the Arts, New York University: Play writing.
- Ruth Ellen Gruber, Writer and Independent Scholar, Morre, Italy: Imaginary Wild Wests in contemporary Europe.
- Allan Gurganus, Writer, Hillsborough, North Carolina: Fiction.

=== H ===
- Carl Haber, Senior Scientist, Physics Division, Lawrence Berkeley National Laboratory: Optical methods to recover sound from mechanical recordings.
- Judith Hall, Poet, Malibu, California; Core Faculty Member, M.F.A. in Poetry Program, New England College; Poetry Editor, The Antioch Review: Poetry.
- Mark Halliday, Poet, Athens, Ohio; Professor of English, Ohio University: Poetry.
- Karen V. Hansen, Professor of Sociology and Women's and Gender Studies, Brandeis University: The Dakota Sioux and Scandinavian homesteaders, 1900-1930.
- Dayna Hanson, Choreographer, Seattle, Washington: Choreography.
- Mike Heffley, Writer, Portland, Oregon;Adjunct Professor, Axia College of Western International University, Phoenix, Arizona: The folkloric and the radical in new and improvised music.
- Michael Henry Heim, Professor of Slavic Languages and Literatures, and of Comparative Literature, University of California, Los Angeles: The theory and practice of advanced language acquisition.
- Frank Herrmann, Artist, Cincinnati, Ohio; Professor of Fine Arts, University of Cincinnati: Painting.
- Constance Valis Hill, Five College Associate Professor of Dance, Hampshire College: A cultural history of tap dancing in America since 1900.
- Kay E. Holekamp, Professor of Zoology, Michigan State University: Development of role-reversed sex differences in behavior and morphology.
- Thomas Hurka, Chancellor Henry N. R. Jackman Distinguished Chair in Philosophical Studies, University of Toronto: British moral philosophy from Sidgwick to Ross.
- Lewis Hyde, Writer, Gambier, Ohio; Richard L. Thomas Professor of Creative Writing, Kenyon College: Our cultural commons.

=== I ===
- Yoko Inoue, Artist, Brooklyn, New York; Visiting Faculty, Bennington College: Installation art.

=== J ===
- Daniel James, Bernardo Mendel Chair of Latin American History, Indiana University: Class, ethnicity, and identity formation in an Argentine meatpacking community.
- Scott Johnson, Composer, New York City: Music composition.

=== K ===
- Zsolt Kadar, Photographer, Los Angeles: Photography.
- Douglas Kahn, Director of Technocultural Studies, University of California, Davis: History of the recognition of natural radio phenomena.
- Carla Kaplan, Professor of English and Gender Studies, University of Southern California: The white women of the Harlem Renaissance.
- Patrick Radden Keefe, Writer, Brooklyn; Program Officer and Fellow, The Century Foundation, New York City: Networks of cross-border criminal and terrorist organizations.
- Garret Keizer, Writer, Sutton, Vermont: A humanistic consideration of noise.
- Brigit Pegeen Kelly, Poet, Arcata, California; Professor of English, University of Illinois, Urbana-Champaign: Poetry.
- Suki Kim, Writer, New York City: Fiction.
- Diane P. Koenker, Professor of History, University of Illinois, Urbana-Champaign: Proletarian tourism and vacations in the USSR.
- Joseph Leo Koerner, Professor in the History of Art, Courtauld Institute of Art: Hieronymus Bosch, Pieter Bruegel, and the painting of everyday life.
- Schuyler S. Korban, Professor of Molecular Genetics and Biotechnology, University of Illinois, Urbana-Champaign: Studies of plant-based vaccines.
- Frank J. Korom, Associate Professor of Religion and Anthropology, Boston University: The impact of modernity on traditional Bengali scroll painters and singers.

=== L ===
- John A. Lane, Independent Scholar, Leiden, The Netherlands: The life and work of the 17th-century typefounder and punchcutter Christoffel van Dijck.
- Brooke Larson, Professor of History, Stony Brook University: Aymara Indians and struggles over power, knowledge, and identity in the Bolivian Andes.
- Anthony J. La Vopa, Professor of History, North Carolina State University: The labor of the mind and the specter of effeminacy in Enlightenment cultures.
- Carol Lawton, Professor of Art History, and Chair, Department of Art and Art History, Lawrence University: Popular Greek religion and the votive reliefs from the Athenian Agora.
- John L'Heureux, Writer, Stanford, California; Professor of English Emeritus, Stanford University: Fiction.
- Cynthia Lin, Artist, New York City; Guest Faculty in Visual Arts, Sarah Lawrence College: Drawing and painting.
- John M. Lipski, Professor of Spanish and Linguistics, Pennsylvania State University: Afro-Hispanic speech today.
- Jia-Ming Liu, Professor of Electrical Engineering, University of California, Los Angeles: Three-dimensional intracellular laser nanoscopy.
- Jianguo (Jack) Liu, Rachel Carson Chair in Ecological Sustainability and Director of Center for Systems Integration and Sustainability, Michigan State University: Pandas, people, and policies.
- Yu Liu, Professor of English, Niagara County Community College: Chinese gardening ideas in the English landscaping revolution.
- Donald S. Lopez, Jr., Arthur E. Link Distinguished University Professor of Buddhist and Tibetan Studies, University of Michigan: A short history of the Buddha.
- Deidre Shauna Lynch, Associate Professor of English, Indiana University, Bloomington: A cultural history of the love of literature.

=== M ===
- L. Mahadevan, Gordon McKay Professor of Applied Mathematics and Mechanics, Professor of Systems Biology, and Professor of Organismic and Evolutionary Biology, Harvard University: Integrative pathophysiology of sickle-cell disease.
- Jake Mahaffy, Film Maker, Roanoke, Virginia; Assistant Professor of Film, Hollins University: Film making.
- Janis Mattox, Composer, Woodside, California: Music composition.
- Joseph Mazur, Writer, Marlboro, Vermont; Professor of Mathematics, Marlboro College: A memoir.
- Richard McCann, Writer, Washington, D.C.; Professor of Literature, M.F.A. Program in Creative Writing, American University: A memoir.
- Neil McWilliam, Walter H. Annenberg Professor of Art and Art History, Duke University: Tradition, identity, and the visual arts in France, 1900-1914.
- William Hamilton Meeks, III, George David Birkhoff Professor of Mathematics, University of Massachusetts, Amherst: The global structure of complete embedded minimal surfaces in three-manifolds.
- Jonathan M. Metzl, Associate Professor of Women's Studies and Psychiatry, and Director, Program in Culture, Health, and Medicine, University of Michigan: Race, stigma, and the diagnosis of schizophrenia.
- Patricia Cox Miller, W. Earl Ledden Professor of Religion, Syracuse University: The corporeal imagination in late antiquity.
- Mark Mitchell, Writer, Gainesville, Florida; Managing Editor, Subtropics Magazine, University of Florida: A biography of Frederic Prokosch.
- Fen Montaigne, Free-lance Writer, Pelham, New York: The Antarctic Peninsula, penguins, and a warming world.
- Susan Brind Morrow, Writer, Chatham, New York: The Pyramid Texts and the development of religious imagery.
- Harriet Murav, Professor and Department Head of Slavic Languages and Literatures, and Professor of World and Comparative Literature, University of Illinois, Urbana-Champaignn: Soviet Yiddish and Russian-Jewish literature of the 20th century.
- Megan Mylan, Documentary Film Maker, New York City: Film making.

=== N ===
- Sally Ann Ness, Professor of Anthropology, University of California, Riverside: An ethnographic study of Yosemite tourism.
- Wilbur Niewald, Artist, Mission, Kansas; Professor of Painting Emeritus, Kansas City Art Institute, Missouri: Painting.
- Ashley Null, Visiting Research Fellow, Faculties of Divinity, Cambridge University; Visiting Research Fellow in Theology, Humboldt University, Berlin: A critical edition of Thomas Cranmer's Great Commonplaces.

=== O ===
- Gina Ochsner, Writer, Keizer, Oregon; Adjunct Instructor, George Fox University: Fiction.
- Peter Orner, Writer, San Francisco; Assistant Professor of Creative Writing, San Francisco State University: Fiction.
- Anthony Pagden, Distinguished Professor of Political Science, University of California, Los Angeles: A history of European cosmopolitanism.

=== P ===
- Roxy Paine, Artist, Brooklyn, New York: Sculpture.
- Nina C. Paley, Animator and Film Maker, New York City; Adjunct Faculty Member, Parsons School of Design: Film making.
- Eric Patrick, Film Maker, Greensboro, North Carolina; Assistant Professor of Broadcasting and Cinema, University of North Carolina, Greensboro: Film making.
- Jamie Peck, Professor of Geography and Sociology, University of Wisconsin, Madison: A critical study of neoliberalism.
- Nancy Lee Peluso, Professor of Society and Environment, and Program Director, Berkeley Workshop in Environmental Politics, University of California, Berkeley: Territoriality, violence, and the production of landscape history in West Kalimantan, Indonesia.
- Theda Perdue, Atlanta Distinguished Term Professor of History, University of North Carolina, Chapel Hill: American Indians in the segregated South, 1870-1970.
- Patrick Phillips, Associate Professor of Biology, University of Oregon: Evolution of genetic architecture.
- John Pollini, Professor of Classical Art and Archaeology, University of Southern California: Christian destruction and desecration of images of classical antiquity.
- Richard B. Primack, Professor of Biology, Boston University: Climate change in Thoreau's Concord.
- Laurence Pringle, Free-lance Writer, West Nyack, New York: Children's books about evolution.
- Michael D. Purugganan, Professor of Biology, New York University: The ecological transcriptome.

=== Q ===
- George Quasha, Video Artist, Barrytown, New York: Video.

=== R ===
- Arden Reed, Arthur M. and Fanny M. Dole Professor of English, Pomona College: Slow art, from tableaux vivants to James Turrell.
- Andrew C. Revkin, Reporter, The New York Times: The pursuit of progress on a planet in flux.
- John V. Robinson, Writer, Crockett, California; Adjunct English Instructor, Las Positas College and Diablo Valley College: The folklore of the high-steel ironworkers.
- Philippe Rochat, Professor of Psychology, Emory University: Origins of possession and sharing.
- Carlo Rotella, Professor of English and Director of American Studies, Boston College: The signifying place of music in human lives.

=== S ===
- Laurent Saloff-Coste, Professor of Mathematics, Cornell University: Diffusions and random walks on groups.
- James Sanders, Principal, James Sanders & Associates; Director, Center for Urban Experience, New York City: The experience of cities.
- Richard Sandler, Film Maker, New York City: Film making.
- Paul Sattler, Artist, Greenfield Center, New York; Associate Professor of Art and Art History, Skidmore College: Painting.
- George Saunders, Writer, Syracuse, New York; Associate Professor of English, Syracuse University: Fiction.
- Norbert F. Scherer, Professor of Chemistry, James Franck Institute and Institute for Biophysical Dynamics, University of Chicago: Long-range electron transfer processes in single proteins.
- Ronald Schuchard, Goodrich C. White Professor of English, Emory University: A complete edition of T. S. Eliot's prose.
- James Shapiro, Larry Miller Professor of English and Comparative Literature, Columbia University: The Shakespeare authorship controversy.
- Stephen J. Shoemaker, Assistant Professor of Religious Studies, University of Oregon: The end of Muhammad's life in Christian and early Islamic sources.
- Andrew Shryock, Associate Professor of Anthropology, University of Michigan: The politics of hospitality in Jordan.
- Britta Sjogren, Film Maker, San Francisco; Associate Professor of Cinema, San Francisco State University: Film making.
- John D. Skrentny, Professor of Sociology, University of California, San Diego: The new racial division of labor in America.
- Daniel Lord Smail, Professor of History, Harvard University: Fama and the culture of publicity in medieval Mediterranean Europe.
- Laurence C. Smith, Professor of Geography, University of California, Los Angeles: The significance of Arctic warming for the planet and society.
- Joel Sobel, Professor of Economics, University of California, San Diego: Information aggregation and group decisions.
- Carl Sander Socolow, Photographer, Camp Hill, Pennsylvania: Photography.
- Steve Stern, Writer, Ballston Spa, New York; Professor of Literature and Creative Writing, Skidmore College: Fiction.
- James A. Stimson, Raymond Dawson Bicentennial Distinguished Professor of Political Science, University of North Carolina, Chapel Hill: The liberalism of professed conservatives in America.
- Darin Strauss, Writer, Brooklyn, New York; Adjunct Professor in Creative Writing, New York University: Fiction.
- Linda Svendsen, Screenwriter, Vancouver, British Columbia, Canada; Professor of Theatre, Film, and Creative Writing, University of British Columbia: Screenwriting.
- Cole Swensen, Poet, Washington, D.C.; Associate Professor of Creative Writing and Comparative Literature, University of Iowa: Poetry.

=== T ===
- Jeff Talman, Sound Artist, Brooklyn, New York; Assistant Professor of Visual and Media Arts, Emerson College: Sound Art.
- John A. Tarduno, Professor of Geophysics and Chair, Earth and Environmental Sciences, and Professor of Physics and Astronomy, University of Rochester: The geomagnetic field and magnetic shielding of the early Earth.
- Tony Tasset, Artist, Oak Park, Illinois; Professor, School of Art and Design, College of Architecture and the Arts, University of Illinois, Chicago: Sculpture.
- William Taubman, Bertrand Snell Professor of Political Science, Amherst College: A biography of Mikhail Gorbachev.
- Jackie Tileston, Artist, Philadelphia; Associate Professor of Fine Arts, University of Pennsylvania: Painting.
- Lynne Tillman, Writer, New York City; Professor of English and Writer-in-Residence, The University at Albany: Fiction.
- Daniel Trueman, Composer, Princeton, New Jersey; Assistant Professor of Music, Princeton University: Music composition.
- Basil Twist, Theatre Artist, New York City; Artistic Director, Tandem Otter Productions: A theatre piece.

=== U ===
- Peter Uvin, Professor of International Humanitarian Studies, Fletcher School, Tufts University: Post-conflict agenda in Burundi from the local perspective.

=== V ===
- Noël Valis, Professor of Spanish, Yale University: Catholicism in modern Spanish narrative.
- Jennifer Vanderbes, Writer, New York City: Fiction.

=== W ===
- Stewart Wallace, Composer, New York City: Music composition.
- Shui-Bo Wang, Film Maker, Montreal, Canada; Director, Experimental Film Department, Central Academy of Fine Arts, Beijing, China; Film Director, National Film Board, Saint-Laurent, Canada: Film making.
- Allen Wells, Roger Howell, Jr., Professor of History, Bowdoin College: General Trujillo, Franklin D. Roosevelt, and the Jews of Sosua (Dominican Republic).
- Leon Wieseltier, Literary Editor, The New Republic: Translation of unpublished writings by Yehuda Amichai.
- Hilary Wilder, Artist, Houston; Instructor, Glassell School of Art, Museum of Fine Arts, Houston: Painting and installation art.
- Anne Winters, Poet, Evanston, Illinois; Professor of English, University of Illinois, Chicago: Poetry.

=== Y ===
- John Yau, Poet, New York City; Assistant Professor of Critical Studies, Mason Gross School of the Arts, Rutgers University: Poetry.
- Robert A. Yelle, Postdoctoral Fellow, Illinois Program for Research in the Humanities; Visiting Assistant Professor, Program for the Study of Religion, University of Illinois, Urbana-Champaign: The influence of Protestant literalism on modern law and religion.
- Bin Yu, Professor of Statistics, University of California, Berkeley: Interpretable models for high-dimensional data.

=== Z ===
- Dennis Zaritsky, Professor of Astronomy, Steward Observatory, University of Arizona: Studies in astronomical image analysis.
- Julian Zelizer, Professor of History, Boston University: National security politics from the Cold War to the war on terrorism.
- Shuguang Zhang, Associate Director, Center for Biomedical Engineering, Massachusetts Institute of Technology: A biosolar nanodevice for direct harvest of solar energy.

== Latin American and Caribbean Fellows ==
=== A ===
- Jorge Accame, Writer, San Salvador de Jujuy, Argentina, and Professor of Social Sciences and Humanities, University of Jujuy: Fiction.
- Humberto Ak'abal, Writer, Momostenango, Totonicapán, Guatemala: Poetry.
- Gabriela Alemán, Professor of Contemporary Arts, University of San Francisco de Quito, Cumbayá, Ecuador: Ecuadorian documentary film, 1920-200.

=== B ===
- Juan Bacigalupo, Professor of Biology, University of Chile, Santiago: New insights in olfactory transduction.

=== C ===
- Rodrigo Cánovas, Professor of Humanities, Pontifical Catholic University of Chile, Santiago: Chilean and Mexican writers of Arab and Jewish origin.
- Yoan Capote, Artist, Havana, Cuba: Sculpture and installation art.
- Miguel José de Asúa, Researcher, National Research Council of Argentina (CONICET), Buenos Aires: Science, medicine, and natural history in early modern Rio de la Plata and Paraguay.

=== D ===
- Christopher Dominguez Michael, Writer, Coyoacán, Mexico: Octavio Paz and the relation of the writer to politics.

=== F ===
- Soledad Fariña, Poet, Santiago, Chile; Professor of Literature, University of Chile; Professor of Literature, University of Diego Portales: Poetry.
- Graciela Frigerio, Director, Center for Multidisciplinary Studies; Director, Master's Degree Program in Education, National University of Entre Ríos, Argentina: State discourse on infancy in Argentina.

=== J ===
- Alfredo Juan, Professor of Solid State Physics and Thermodynamics, National University of the South, Argentina; Independent Researcher, National Research Council of Argentina (CONICET): A theoretical approach to the hydrogen-metal interaction.

=== K ===
- Alicia Juliana Kowaltowski, Associate Professor of Biochemistry, University of São Paulo: Mitochondrial regulation of cell survival.

=== L ===
- Mirta Zaida Lobato, Associate Professor, Faculty of Arts, University of Buenos Aires: Culture, identity, and politics in the Latin American working class.
- Florencia Luna, Adjunct Researcher, National Research Council of Argentina (CONICET): Post-trial obligations.

=== M ===
- Mario G. Maldonado, Henry R. Luce Professor in Brain, Mind and Medicine: Cross-Cultural Perspectives, Claremont Colleges, California: Diagnostic Skills of Quichua Healers of the Andes.
- Pablo A. Marquet, Professor of Ecology, Pontifical Catholic University of Chile, Santiago: Key problems in macroecology.
- Myriam Moscona, Poet, Mexico City: Poetry.

=== O ===
- David Oubiña, Professor, Faculty of Philosophy and Letters, University of Buenos Aires; Professor, Faculty of Cinematography, University of the Cinema, Buenos Aires: Transformations of authorship in Argentine cinema, 1960-1980.

=== P ===
- Vicente Palermo, Independent Researcher, Gino Germani Institute (UBA), National Research Council of Argentina (CONICET); Professor and Researcher, FLACSO - Argentina: Republic, market, and society in Argentina and Brazil.
- Edmundo Paz Soldán, Associate Professor of Romance Studies, Cornell University: Fiction.
- Gabriela Prado, Choreographer, Buenos Aires; Professor of Dance, National University of Arts (IUNA), Buenos Aires: Choreography.
- Fernando Prats, Artist, Barcelona, Spain: Painting.

=== R ===
- Gabriel Adrián Rabinovich, independent researcher, National Research Council of Argentina (CONICET): The impact of protein-glycan interactions in tumor-immune escape.
- Laura Restrepo, writer, Bogota, Colombia: Fiction.
- Gustavo Romano, artist, Buenos Aires: Digital art.
- Ethelia Ruiz Medrano, professor in historical studies, National Institute of Anthropology and History, México: Historical arguments for Indian rights.

=== S ===
- Lilia Moritz Schwarcz, Professor of Social Anthropology, University of São Paulo: The "invention" of the tropics in colonial Brazil.
- Victor Sira, Photographer, New York City: Photography.
- Gabriela Siracusano, Career Scientific Researcher, National Research Council of Argentina (CONICET); Professor, Faculty of Philosophy and Letters, University of Buenos Aires; President, Centro Argentino de investigadores de Arte: The ritual uses of pigments in 16th- and 17th-century Andean and Spanish artistic practices.
- Maristella Noemí Svampa, Associate Professor, National University of General Sarmiento, Buenos Aires: The mind-set of protestors in contemporary cases of Latin American mass mobilization.

=== T ===
- Mariano Tommasi, Professor and Chair, Department of Economics, University of San Andrés, Buenos Aires; President, Latin American and Caribbean Economic Association: Political institutions, state capacities, and the quality of public policy.
- Alejandro Toro-Labbé, Professor of Chemistry, Pontifical Catholic University of Chile, Santiago: A new concept to characterize reaction mechanisms.
- Diego F. Torres, Ramon y Cajal Researcher, Higher Council of Scientific Investigation, Barcelona, Spain: High-energy emission from regions of star formation.
- Juan Travnik, Photographer, Buenos Aires; Director, Fotogalería del Teatro San Martín, Buenos Aires: Photography.
