= Hilda Habichayn =

Argentine sociologist (1934–2021)

- Born: 26 February 1934; Marcelino Escalada, San Justo Department, Santa Fe, Argentina
- Died: 6 May 2021 (aged 87); Rosario, Santa Fe, Argentina
- Other names: Hilda Habichayn de Bonaparte
- Occupation: Academic
- Years active: 1968–2007

Hilda Habichayn (26 February 1934 – 6 May 2021) was an Argentine sociologist and feminist. She founded the Centro de Estudios Históricos sobre las Mujeres (Center for Historical Studies on Women) at the National University of Rosario in 1989 and an academic journal Zona Franca in 1992. The center, later renamed as Centro de Estudios Interdisciplinario sobre las Mujeres (CEIM, Center for Interdisciplinary Studies on Women) offered the first post-graduate degree in women's studies in Latin America from 1993. She served as director of the center and journal until her retirement in 2007.

== Early life and education ==
Hilda Habichayn was born on 26 February 1934 in Marcelino Escalada, San Justo Department, Santa Fe, Argentina, to Thamine and Jorge Habichayn. She graduated from the Liceo Nacional de Santa Fe (National Lyceum of Santa Fe) in 1951 and went on to study philosophy at the Universidad Nacional del Litoral. After graduating with her bachelor's degree in 1960, Habichayn earned a post-graduate degree from Facultad Latinoamericana de Ciencias Sociales–Chile (FLASCO-Chile, Latin American Faculty of Social Sciences-Chile) in sociology in 1961. Continuing her studies, she completed a master's degree in The Hague, Netherlands, from the International Institute of Social Studies in 1967.

== Career ==
Returning to Argentina after her studies abroad, Habichayn was hired to teach sociology at the National University of Rosario, but was fired because of her political left-leaning ideas and unable to work in university settings from the Onganía to the Videla presidencies. She taught at a secondary school in Rosario, Santa Fe from 1968 until 1984. She was one of the founding members of the Asociación Rosarina de Educación Sexual (ARES, Rosarian Association of Sexual Education), organized by Ana María Zeno in 1976. This was the first organization in Argentina to train professionals on contraception, sexuality, and sex education.

When the dictatorship fell, she returned to the university. In 1989, Habichayn founded the Centro de Estudios Históricos sobre las Mujeres (Center for Historical Studies on Women) at the National University of Rosario, which was renamed as the Centro de Estudios Interdisciplinario sobre las Mujeres (CEIM, Center for Interdisciplinary Studies on Women) in 1991. The academics associated with the center were feminist activists who wanted to address the inequalities between men and women and the lack of research on women and restrictive social hierarchies. These included academics such as Habichayn's husband, Héctor Bonaparte, Nidia Areces, Marta Bonaudo, María Inés Carzolio, Gabriela D'alla Corte, Elida Sonzoni, María Cecilia Stroppa, who held Friday meetings to discuss projects and coordinate activities. Initially they focused on filling the gaps of women's historic participation in society, but quickly began to move to a wider scope focusing on women's and gender issues across academic disciplines.

At the time, women's studies were not widely accepted as an academic field, and Habichayn had to press the administration for accreditation. Mónica Tarducci, a colleague and anthropologist, noted that convincing the Comision Nacional de Evaluación y Acreditación Universitaria (CoNEAU, National Commission for University Evaluation and Accreditation) was an arduous process and took Habichayn over three years. Finally in 1993, she secured approval for the first master's degree program in women's studies in Latin America. Students who enrolled in the program were taught by academics like Ana Amado, Nora Domínguez, Catalina Wainerman, and others, from various universities. The previous year, she also founded and became editor-in-chief of the journal Zona Franca (Free Zone), which served as the publishing medium for academics of CEIM. Habachayn was one of the founders of the Centro para los Nuevos Roles (CENUR, Center for New Roles), a feminist space and publishing house in 1997.

Although Habichayn published many articles and book chapters, her most known work was Rescoldo bajo las cenizas: Las mil y una formas de exclusión y reclusión de las mujeres (2005, Embers under the Ashes: The Thousand and One Forms of Exclusion and Confinement of Women). The book was an evaluation of the changing landscape for women and feminism through time in Argentina. Among the themes explored were family violence, health and maternity, sexuality and prostitution and the socio-cultural constructs of how policies dealing with these issues changed over time. In 2006, the Deliberative Council of Rosario honored her as a pioneer in gender studies on International Women's Day. She retired the following year as manager of CEIM and editor-in-chief of Zona Franca.

== Death and legacy ==
Habichayn died on 6 May 2021 in Rosario. She is remembered for her pioneering role in establishing women's studies in Argentina and founding the first master's program in the field in Latin America.
