= Lugones =

Lugones may refer to:

- Lugones (surname)
- Lugones, Siero, a parish in Siero, Asturias, Spain
- Lugones, Santiago del Estero, a municipality and village in Santiago del Estero Province, Argentina
