= Ana Amado =

Argentine journalist and academic (1946–2016)

- Born: Ana María Amado; 11 May 1946; Santiago del Estero Province, Argentina
- Died: 9 November 2016 (aged 70); Buenos Aires, Argentina
- Other name: Cristina Benítez
- Education: Catholic University of Santiago del Estero; University of Buenos Aires; Leiden University
- Occupations: Journalist; filmmaker; academic; feminist
- Years active: 1970–2015
- Spouse: Nicolás Casullo (m. 1974; died 2008)
- Children: 2

Ana Amado (11 May 1946 – 9 November 2016) was an Argentine journalist, filmmaker, academic and feminist. In Mexico while in exile, she produced films under the name Cristina Benítez. Amado grew up in rural Argentina and, after training to be a teacher, earned a degree in political science from the Catholic University of Santiago del Estero. During her schooling, she began to work as a television news producer and print journalist. Orphaned when she was young, she moved to Buenos Aires after her graduation and worked for several different television news stations. Traveling abroad with her job, she interviewed subjects like Fidel Castro and Muammar Gaddafi. Because of her support for the leftist Montoneros radicals, she became a target of the Triple A terrorist squads in 1974. Her boyfriend Nicolás Casullo was also targeted, causing the couple to marry and go into exile.

Amado went to Caracas, Venezuela, where she made films and commercials for the Ministry of Culture for two years. In 1976, the couple moved to Mexico City, where she wrote for various newspapers, contributed to several magazines as a film critic, presented news for multiple television stations, and created documentary films. She also worked as a professor at the Universidad Autónoma Metropolitana (UAM, Autonomous Metropolitan University) and the Universidad Nacional Autónoma de México (UNAM, National Autonomous University of Mexico), while continuing her graduate courses. Coming into contact with feminists, she conducted research on indigenous women at the Instituto Latinoamericano de Estudios Transnacionales (ILET, Latin American Institute for Transnational Studies) and prepared her thesis. The potential for the election of 1983 to result in a return to democracy in Argentina led the couple to return home that year.

On her return, Amado submitted her thesis to the University of Buenos Aires, but its approval was delayed until her advisor returned from exile. Initially she worked as a journalist but was hired to head ILET's women and society department between 1987 and 1990. Employed as an assistant professor in the faculty of philosophy and letters at the University of Buenos Aires in 1990, she later served three terms as chair of film analysis and film criticism in the arts department. In 1992, she joined with other women academics to found a women's studies curriculum and the journal Mora. Five years later, the program became the Instituto Interdisciplinario de Estudios de Género (Interdisciplinary Institute of Gender Studies) at the University of Buenos Aires. In 2008, she earned her PhD from Leiden University and continued to teach in Argentina and abroad until 2015. Amado died in 2016 and is remembered for her works analyzing Argentine history and as one of the founders of the field of gender studies in Argentina.

== Early life and education ==
Ana María Amado was born on 11 May 1946, in Santiago del Estero Province, Argentina. Her father was engaged in manufacturing wooden products, and her mother was a teacher. Her mother's family came to Argentina from Italy in the nineteenth century and her paternal grandparents were from Syria. The oldest of four siblings, Amado attended school in Lugones until the sixth grade, when her family moved to Santiago del Estero. She graduated in 1961 with teaching credentials from the Colegio Belén (Belén College), a private Catholic school. Continuing her studies, she enrolled in political science courses at the Catholic University of Santiago del Estero. Her parents were killed in an accident in 1964, and she and her brothers went to live with an aunt.

During her schooling, Amado was assisted by the Fundación Juan Alberto Harriet (Juan Alberto Harriet Foundation), which sent her to Boston, Massachusetts, in 1969. She took courses at Harvard University with Marshall McLuhan, before returning to complete her degree from the Catholic University of Santiago del Estero in 1972. While studying, she went to work at the local television station as a news producer. In 1970, she created Nuestra tarde (Our Evening), a program she produced and aired on weekends through 1971. Simultaneously she wrote for the local newspaper, publishing articles on women's issues such as abortion and adoption.

== Career ==
=== Early career (1972–1974) ===
Amado moved to Buenos Aires after graduating in 1972. She began airing a music program, Música en libertad (Music in Freedom) on Channel 9, but quickly moved to Channel 13 reporting on the popular newscast Telenoche. She supported the Montoneros, a Trotskyist group of radical, urban guerillas, joining their youth corps. Amado began working as an on-air journalist, reporting for the state-owned Channel 7, from 1973. She covered politics and produced stories on third world countries traveling to Romania; Cuba, where she interviewed Fidel Castro; and Libya, where she interviewed Muammar Gaddafi. She also produced a two-hour show with Norman Briski which aired daily on Radio Belgrano.

In 1974, Amado was invited to meet with the Ministry of Education to discuss setting up Channel 4 for educational programs. She met Nicolás Casullo, an advisor to Jorge Taiana in the Departamento de Cultura y Comunicación (Department of Culture and Communication). Although the project fell apart, she continued meeting with Casullo in regard to her radio program, and they began dating. When Isabel Perón succeeded her husband as President of Argentina, she allowed José López Rega to become the de facto Prime Minister. He implemented a terrorist campaign against leftists, which resulted in Amado's boss warning her not to come to work at Channel 7. Casullo also quit going to the Ministry of Education because he had been placed on the "death list" of the Triple A. The couple secretly married in November 1974, and a few days later, Casullo left for Cuba. Shortly thereafter, Amado left for Caracas, Venezuela.

=== Exile (1974–1983) ===
After arriving in Caracas, Amado first worked for an advertising agency and then began making films and commercials for the Ministry of Culture. Among her films were a production about the nationalization of the oil industry and another about the Barí people and their traditional way of life. On meeting a fellow Argentine who had collected decades of political magazines, she filmed his entire collection. Her documentary film, Ruidos en la cabeza (Noises in the Head) created for Productora Creativos Audiovisuales (Creative Audiovisual Productions), aired in 1976. Casullo eventually joined her in Venezuela, but as he was legally unable to work, the couple decided to move to Mexico City that year, when they were offered paid employment at El Universal.

In addition to working as a journalist, Amado was hired as a professor at the Universidad Autónoma Metropolitana (UAM, Autonomous Metropolitan University) and worked in the film library at the Universidad Nacional Autónoma de México (UNAM, National Autonomous University of Mexico). Her work at the library focused on producing a film about the Montoneros. Using the magazines she had filmed in Caracas, Amado produced a one-hour documentary Montoneros, crónica de una guerra de liberación (Montoneros: Chronicle of a Liberation War), which she directed under the pseudonym Cristina Benítez with a script on the history of Peronism written by Casullo, who used the name Hernán Castillo. While she was making the film, she gave birth to her oldest daughter Mariana, followed in 1981 by another daughter, Liza. The documentary was released in 1977. She was hired by UNAM to teach and as a director for the Grupo Cine de la Resistencia (Resistance Film Group) in the department of cinematography.

Between 1977 and 1983, Amado wrote film reviews for the newspaper Unomásuno and worked as an editor for the journal Comunicación y Cultura (Communication and Culture). She took post-graduate courses at UAM and taught semiology classes at both UAM and UNAM. At the same time, she conducted research at Instituto Latinoamericano de Estudios Transnacionales (ILET, Latin American Institute for Transnational Studies) focusing on indigenous women. The research brought her in contact for the first time with feminists from Mexico and Chile, changing her view of the women's movement. She began preparing her graduate thesis based on interviews with women from indigenous communities. With the election of 1983 promising a return to democracy in Argentina, the couple decided to take their family home.

=== Later career (1983–2015) ===
Settling in Once de Septiembre at the beginning of 1983, Amado had a difficult time locating adequate schooling for her daughters because during the dictatorship the school system had declined. Schooling for her daughters and submitting her thesis, El discurso femenino como comunicación alternativa (The Female Discourse as Alternative Communication), were her first priorities. The thesis had been completed with the advisor Héctor Schmucler, a former faculty member of the philosophy and letters department at the University of Buenos Aires, whom she had known in Mexico while working at his magazine Comunicación y Cultura. Schmucler returned to Argentina in 1986, and her thesis was accepted in 1987.

Initially Amado found work as a journalist working at Perfil and as an editorial secretary for the magazine Somos in the politics section and later women's section. In late 1983, she began working at Revista Vivir (Live Magazine) for Alicia Entel, whom she had met through ILET. At that time, Casullo became co-director of ILET with Alcira Argumedo, and Amado headed ILET's women and society department between 1987 and 1990. In 1989, Chilean feminists she had known in Mexico returned home and founded Red alternativa de Prensa femenina en América Latina (FEMPRES, Alternative Network of Women's Press in Latin America), and she began working as its Argentine correspondent. The magazine survived until 1990 and focused on publishing information about women's issues, evaluating the position of women in society throughout Latin America. When the magazine folded, she contributed to publications such as Clarín and Página 12.

In 1990, Amado was employed as an assistant professor in the faculty of philosophy and letters at the University of Buenos Aires. She became chair of film analysis and film criticism in the arts department, and was elected as the departmental director three times, serving through 1996. In 1992, she was also elected to the Board of Directors of the university. That year, representing the arts, she began working with other women academics, including anthropologist Mirta Ana Barbieri; educationalist Nora Domínguez; historians Mirta Zaida Lobato, Susana Murphy, and Marcela Nari; and philosopher Margarita Roulet to create an interdisciplinary women's studies curriculum. Initially known as the Área Interdisciplinaria de Estudios de la Mujer (AIEM, Interdisciplinary Area of Women's Studies), and from 1997 as the Instituto Interdisciplinario de Estudios de Género (IIEGE, Interdisciplinary Institute of Gender Studies), they introduced gender as a field of academic study at the University of Buenos Aires and founded the journal Mora. She and Domínguez created a course, "Construcciones y narraciones de género en cine, literatura y prensa escrita" ("Gender Constructions and Narratives in Cinema, Literature and the Written Press"), which they offered through 1998.

In addition to her teaching at the University of Buenos Aires, Amado taught as a visiting professor at National University of Rosario, UNAM, and Princeton University, as well as Duke University in 2001. Together with Domínguez, in 2004 she published a book examining the way families were portrayed in literature. In 2008, Amada was awarded a PhD in Humanities from Leiden University, where she completed her doctoral thesis, La imagen justa: cine argentino y política, 1980–2007 (The Just Image: Argentine Cinema and Politics, 1980–2007) under the direction of Luz Rodríguez Carranza, an Argentine exile who remained abroad. The name of the work was a play on the duality of the word "just" – in other words, did films portray just an image, or was it the just (correct or right) image. The following year, her thesis was published as a book under the same title. It analyzed the way politics changed films over the period, first creating the myths of the regime, then completely ignoring the terror and repression, and finally questioning and demanding answers for the lack of portrayals. In 2010, she was awarded a two-year Guggenheim Fellowship to continue her evaluation of political insurgency and public perception as depicted in Argentine visual arts. She continued to lecture at the University of Buenos Aires and at the Instituto de Iberoamérica (Ibero-American Institute) of the University of Salamanca through the end of 2015.

== Death and legacy ==
Amado died on 9 or 10 November 2016 in Buenos Aires after an illness of several weeks. (Note: Libertella states on 10 November "Murió ayer en Buenos Aires" ["She died yesterday in Buenos Aires"]; whereas Domínguez writes "El 10 de noviembre de 2016 falleció nuestra querida compañera Ana Amado" ["On 10 November 2016, our dear colleague Ana Amado passed away"].) She is remembered as a mentor by colleagues and as a founder of the field of gender studies in Argentina. In addition to founding the journal Mora and her own publishing, she contributed chapters to several anthologies and was the editor of Ediciones Colihue's book series on cinema.

== Selected works ==
- Valle, Norma; Hiriart, Bertha; Amada, Ana María (1996). El abc de un periodismo no sexista: espacio para la igualdad [The ABCs of Non-Sexist Journalism: Space for Equality] (in Spanish). Santiago, Chile: Fempress. OCLC 41991640.
- Amada, Ana María; Domínguez, Nora (2004). Lazos de familia: herencias, cuerpos, ficciones [Family Ties: Inheritances, Bodies, Fictions] (in Spanish) (1a. ed.). Buenos Aires, Argentina: Editorial Paidós. ISBN 978-950-12-3813-6.
- Amado, Ana María. (2009). La imagen justa: cine argentino y política, 1980-2007 [The Just Image: Argentine Cinema and Politics 1980–2007] (in Spanish) (1. ed.). Buenos Aires, Argentina: Ediciones Colihue. ISBN 978-950-563-730-0.
