= Tarducci =

Tarducci is an Italian surname. Notable people with the surname include:

- Fabrizio Tarducci (born 1976), Italian rapper better known as Fabri Fibra
- Francesco Tarducci (born 1980), Italian rapper better known as Nesli
- Mónica Tarducci, Argentine anthropologist and activist
