= Ruth Ellen Gruber =

American journalist and author (born 1949)

- Gruber in 2008
- Born: October 6, 1949 (age 77); Philadelphia, Pennsylvania, U.S.
- Education: Oberlin College (BA)
- Occupations: Journalist; author
- Employer: United Press International; Jewish Telegraphic Agency
- Father: Jacob W. Gruber
- Relatives: Samuel D. Gruber (brother)
- Awards: Guggenheim Fellowship (2006); Knight's Cross of the Order of Merit of the Republic of Poland (2011)

Ruth Ellen Gruber (born October 6, 1949) is an American journalist and author. After serving as an intern at Associated Press, she became a correspondent at United Press International, where she was chief correspondent of the Warsaw bureau from 1981 until her 1983 expulsion from the country by communist authorities. She later became a senior correspondent at Jewish Telegraphic Agency. She has also written several books in Jewish heritage and culture as an independent scholar.

== Biography ==
Ruth Ellen Gruber was born on October 6, 1949, in Philadelphia, the daughter of Jacob W. Gruber and Shirley Moskowitz. She attended Plymouth-Whitemarsh High School. She obtained a BA from Oberlin College in 1971. In 1973, she started at Associated Press as an intern in Rome.

In 1974, Gruber joined United Press International as a correspondent in their Rome bureau. She worked as a correspondent and editor at their Brussels (1974–1977) and London (1977–1978) bureaus. She served as chief of the Belgrade bureau from 1978 until 1981, when she moved to the Warsaw bureau as chief correspondent. She was also involved in the Flying University movement during her time in Warsaw.

On January 11, 1983, Gruber was detained by Polish communist authorities on charges of sending classified information, before being released the next after a 22-hour period of interrogation. On January 13, the Polish Press Agency announced that Gruber's press credentials would be revoked and that the government had ordered her expulsion from the country. Gruber has since maintained that these charges were political. Following her expulsion from Poland, she became chief correspondent for the Eastern Europe bureau that same year, serving until the next year.

In 1990, Gruber joined Jewish Telegraphic Agency as a senior correspondent for Europe. In 2011, she was awarded the Knight's Cross of the Order of Merit, receiving the honor from president of Poland Bronisław Komorowski at the Consulate General of Poland, New York City. She served as the Spring 2015 Arnold Distinguished Visiting Chair in Jewish Studies at the College of Charleston.

Outside of journalism, Gruber is also an independent scholar and book author. She wrote several books on Jewish culture and heritage: National Geographic Jewish Heritage Travel (1992), Jewish Heritage Travel: A Guide to Central and Eastern Europe (1992), Upon the Doorposts of Thy House: Jewish Life in East-Central Europe, Yesterday and Today (1994), and Virtually Jewish: Reinventing Jewish Culture in Europe (2002). She worked as a consultant at Centropa in 2001 and was a visiting scholar at the Autry Museum of the American West in 2004. In 2006, she was awarded a Guggenheim Fellowship for "a study of imaginary Wild Wests in contemporary Europe". She also co-ordinates Rothschild Foundation Hanadiv Europe's Jewish Heritage Europe website.

Due to her name's similarity to Ruth Gruber, the two often received letters and email meant for the other person, including a letter congratulating the elder Ruth for an award and a massive deluge of viewer mail in response to the 2001 CBS miniseries Haven (based on the elder Ruth's book). News articles would often run images of a different Ruth than the subject, and she was once mistaken for the elder Ruth at a 1990s American Jewish Committee meeting, where an attendant told her she was at their house "in the '40s".

Her brother is historian Samuel D. Gruber.

== Works ==
- National Geographic Jewish Heritage Travel (1992)
- Jewish Heritage Travel: A Guide to Central and Eastern Europe (1992) (Note: Reviews of this book:)
- Upon the Doorposts of Thy House: Jewish Life in East-Central Europe, Yesterday and Today (1994)
- Virtually Jewish: Reinventing Jewish Culture in Europe (2002) (Note: Reviews of this book:)
