= Nora Domínguez =

Argentine literary scholar (born 1951)

- Born: Nora Noemí Domínguez Rubio; 1951 (age 74–75); Buenos Aires, Argentina
- Other name: Nora Domínguez Rubio
- Occupation: Academic
- Years active: 1989–present

Nora Domínguez (born 1951) is a full professor of literary theory at the University of Buenos Aires. She was a co-founder of the Instituto Interdisciplinario de Estudios de Género (Interdisciplinary Institute of Gender Studies) at the University of Buenos Aires, which introduced gender studies as an academic field in 1992. Between 2010 and 2017, she was the director of the institute. Her book De dónde vienen los niños. Maternidad y escritura en la cultura argentina (Where Do Children Come From: Motherhood and Writing in Argentine Culture, 2007) won the Essay Prize from the National Arts Foundation. In 2021, she published El revés del rostro. Figuras de la exterioridad en la cultura argentina (The Reverse of the Face: Figures of Exteriority in Argentine Culture), which won the Humanities Prize for the Southern Cone from the Latin American Studies Association in 2022. She is currently directing a six-volume work to compile the series Historia feminista de la literatura argentina (Feminist History of Argentine Literature). The first volume in the series was released in 2020.

== Early life and education ==
Nora Noemí Domínguez Rubio was born in 1951 in Buenos Aires, Argentina. She received certification as a teacher from the Universidad del Salvador in 1974 and a bachelor's degree in letters from the same institution in 1987. She began her schooling during the dictatorship and until the return to democracy, literary theory was not part of her formal education. Private study groups, referred to as the Universidad de las Catacumbas (University of the Catacombs), were organized to teach materials outside the approved curricula. When she began studying with Josefina Ludmer, in one of these groups, Domínguez recognized the power of literature. As the country returned to democracy, other teachers like Ramón Alcade, Ángel Núñez, and Jorge Lafforgue introduced new ways of looking at literature to the curricula, as a means of evaluating and critiquing policies and ideologies. She took graduate courses with Ludmer until 1989, when her mentor moved to the United States.

== Career ==
Domínguez began teaching as an adjunct professor at the Universidad Nacional de Mar del Plata (National University in Mar del Plata) in 1989. She began giving a gender studies lecture there in 1990, after Ludmer had introduced her to feminist literature. Two years later, she left Mar del Plata and worked with an interdisciplinary group of women academics at the University of Buenos Aires (UBA) to found the Área Interdisciplinaria de Estudios de la Mujer (AIEM, Interdisciplinary Area of Women's Studies). Besides Domínguez, the co-founders were Ana Amado, chair of the arts department; anthropologist Mirta Ana Barbieri; historians Mirta Zaida Lobato, Susana Murphy, and Marcela Nari; and philosopher Margarita Roulet. The group introduced the academic field of women's studies to UBA and founded the journal Mora. In 1997, the program was renamed as the Instituto Interdisciplinario de Estudios de Género (IIEGE, Interdisciplinary Institute of Gender Studies). She and Amado created a course, "Construcciones y narraciones de género en cine, literatura y prensa escrita ("Gender Constructions and Narratives in Cinema, Literature and the Written Press"), which they offered through 1998.

Domínguez studied for her PhD under Jorge Panesi, completing a thesis Las representaciones literarias de la maternidad: literatura argentina, 1950–2000 (Literary Representations of Motherhood: Argentine Literature, 1950–2000), and earning her PhD in 2005. Her 2007 work, De dónde vienen los niños. Maternidad y escritura en la cultura argentina (Where Do Children Come From: Motherhood and Writing in Argentine Culture) evaluated literary portrayals of mothers in Argentine culture, and received the Premio de Ensayo (Essay Prize) from the Fondo Nacional de las Artes (National Arts Foundation). In 2008, she was awarded a Guggenheim Fellowship, and simultaneously earned her master's degree (GEMMA), under the gender and women's studies program of the European Union's Erasmus Mundus project. Between 2010 and 2017, she served as the director of IIEGE, leading research into a wide variety of topics exploring gender and women's roles as portrayed by different academic fields, in literature, and over time, throughout Latin America. She is a full professor of literary theory at UBA.

Domínguez began planning a multiple volume series which analyzed the representations of women between the nineteenth and twenty-first centuries in Argentine literature in 2017. The books were to combine a general women's history with the political and literary history to place each writer in context and within the themes of poets, journalists, story tellers, and other literary areas. The volumes planned were prepared jointly with Florence Angilletta, Laura Arnés, Graciela Batticuore, Paula Bertúa, Paula Bianchi, Lucía María De Leone, Tania Diz, Silvia Jurovietzky, Andrea Ostrov, María José Punte, Claudia Torre, and María Vicens and began with the twenty-first century working back in time. The series, Historia feminista de la literatura argentina (Feminist History of Argentine Literature), will have five volumes and the sixth will be a feminist dictionary. The first volume, En la intemperie. Poéticas de la fragilidad y la revuelta (In the Open: Poems of Fragility and Revolt) was released in 2020. The following year, her book El revés del rostro. Figuras de la exterioridad en la cultura argentina (The Reverse of the Face: Figures of Exteriority in Argentine Culture) was published. In the work, the face is a metaphor for the visible and invisible, the way people see themselves and are seen by others, and the positive and negative cultural perceptions of beauty and identity. It won the Latin American Studies Association's Premio de Humanidades (Humanities Prize) for the Southern Cone in 2022.

== Selected works ==
- Domínguez, Nora (2000). "Diálogos del género o como no caerse del mapa" [Gender Dialogues or How Not to Fall Off the Map]. Estudos Feministas (in Spanish). 8 (2). Santa Catarina, Brazil: Universidade Federal de Santa Catarina: 113–126. ISSN 0104-026X. JSTOR 43596554. OCLC 6908038963.
- Amada, Ana María; Domínguez, Nora (2004). Lazos de familia: herencias, cuerpos, ficciones [Family Ties: Inheritances, Bodies, Fictions] (in Spanish) (1a. ed.). Buenos Aires, Argentina: Editorial Paidós. ISBN 978-950-12-3813-6.
- Domínguez Rubio, Nora (2004). Las representaciones literarias de la maternidad: literatura argentina, 1950-2000 [Literary Representations of Motherhood: Argentine Literature, 1950–2000] (PhD) (in Spanish). Buenos Aires, Argentina: Universidad de Buenos Aires.
- Domínguez, Nora (2005). "Dar la cara. Rostridad y relato materno en 'El desierto y su semilla' de Jorge Barón Biza [Giving Face: Faciality and Related Maternity in 'The Desert and Its Seed' by Jorge Barón Biza]". In Moraña, Mabel; Olivera-Williams, María Rosa (eds.). El salto de Minerva: intelectuales, género y Estado en América Latina [Minerva's Leap: Intellectuals, Gender, and the State in Latin America] (in Spanish). Frankfurt am Maim, Germany: Vervuert Verlagsgesellschaft. pp. 87–100. ISBN 978-3-86527-813-5. OCLC 8000936565.
- Domínguez, Nora (2006). "Puntos de encuentro. Escritoras del Cono Sur [Meeting Points: Writers of the Southern Cone]". In Morant, Isabel (ed.). Historia de las mujeres en España y América Latina [History of Women in Spain and Latin America] (in Spanish). Vol. IV. Del siglo xx a los umbrales del xxi [From the 20th Century to the Thresholds of the 21st] (1a. ed.). Madrid, Spain: Cátedra. pp. 753–780. ISBN 978-84-376-2290-3.
- Domínguez, Nora (2007). De donde vienen los niños. Maternidad y escritura en la cultura argentina [Where Do Children Come From: Motherhood and Writing in Argentine Culture] (in Spanish) (1a. ed.). Rosario, Argentina: Beatriz Viterbo Editora. ISBN 978-950-845-201-6.
- Domínguez, Nora (2008). "Presencias póstumas: escrituras del tiempo, tiempos de escritura [Posthumous Presences: Writings of Time, Times of Writing ]". In Rodríguez, Ileana; Szurmuk, Mónica (eds.). Trazos y fragmentos: memoria, ciudadanía [Traces and Fragments: Memory, Citizenship] (in Spanish) (1a. ed.). Santiago, Chile: Editorial Cuarto propio. pp. 285–309. ISBN 978-956-260-446-8.
- Arnés, Laura A.; Domínguez, Nora; Punte, María José, eds. (2020). Historia feminista de la literatura argentina [Feminist History of Argentine Literature] (in Spanish). Vol. 1. En la intemperie. Poéticas de la fragilidad y la revuelta [In the Open: Poems of Fragility and Revolt] (1a. ed.). Córdoba, Argentina: Editorial Universitaria de Villa María. ISBN 978-987-699-622-8.
- Domínguez, Nora (2021). El revés del rostro. Figuras de la exterioridad en la cultura argentina [The Reverse of the Face: Figures of Exteriority in Argentine Culture] (in Spanish) (Primeraición ed.). Rosario, Argentina: Beatriz Viterbo Editora. ISBN 978-950-845-407-2.
