= Katia Escalera =

Bolivian operatic soprano

Katia Giselle Escalera (born 20 September 1974) is a Bolivian operatic soprano. A native of Cochabamba, Escalera graduated from the Eastman School of Music at the University of Rochester in 1996 with a Bachelor of Music. She has been an Adler Fellow at the San Francisco Opera, winner of the Aspen Summer Music Festival's Concerto Competition, and placed first in the Lotte Lenya Vocal Competition. She is known for her vivid, natural stage presence, and versatile, clear voice. Among her recordings are the collaborations with the Florilegium Music Ensemble on Bolivian Baroque Volumes 1 & 2. She is also lyric soprano on Janis Mattox's Solombra.

Escalera was named 2004's Outstanding and Excellent Bolivian Professional by the Human Development Foundation of Bolivia.

== Sources ==
- Kohan, Pablo, "Con ayuda de Telemann", La Nación, 3 August 2006
- Luján, Mónica, Katia Escalera: "Cantar es una adicción", Los Tiempos, 9/08/2009
- La Razón, "Un disco da la bienvenida al VI Festival de Música de Chiquitos", 14 September 2005
