= AIEM =

AIEM may refer to:

- Abacus Institute of Engineering and Management, India
- Aryabhatta Institute of Engineering & Management Durgapur, India
- Área Interdisciplinaria de Estudios de la Mujer (AIEM), or Interdisciplinary Area of Women's Studies, founded by Mirta Zaida Lobato at the University of Buenos Aires
