= Kathryn Alexander =

American composer (born 1955)

- Born: Texas
- Genres: Contemporary classical music electroacoustic music
- Occupation: Composer

Kathryn Alexander (born 1955) is a Guggenheim Award-winning American composer and a professor of composition at Yale University.

== Early life and education ==
Alexander was born in Texas and was involved with music from an early age. She earned a bachelor's degree at Baylor University studying flute with Helen Ann Shanley, and went on to the Cleveland Institute of Music to study with Maurice Sharp. While at Cleveland, she began to compose. She sought guidance from Cleveland faculty Donald Erb and Eugene O'Brien, and went on to earn a DMA in composition at the Eastman School of Music, working with Samuel Adler, Barbara Kolb, Allan Schindler, and Joseph Schwantner. While at Eastman, she became one of the first women to teach in the Eastman Computer Music Center (now the Eastman Audio Research Studio). She pursued additional study with Leon Kirchner at the Tanglewood Music Center.

== Career ==
Alexander serves on the faculty of the Department of Music at Yale University, where she has taught composition and music technology since 1996. She is the founding director of the Yale Music and Technology Lab (YaleMusT). She previously taught at the Oberlin Conservatory of Music, Dartmouth College, and the University of Oregon. An influential pedagogue, she has trained prominent rising composers such as Timo Andres and Wilbert Roget, II.

She composes both acoustic and electroacoustic music, for instrumental forces ranging from chamber ensemble to solo voice and orchestra to multimedia works. Her ensemble works have been performed by the JACK Quartet, the New York New Music Ensemble, the Argento Ensemble, the Blue Elm Trio, the Deering Estate Chamber Ensemble, Fifth House Ensemble, the NOW Ensemble, Williams Chamber Players, the Yale Camerata, and the Yale Percussion Group.

She co-founded contemporary music festival New Music on the Point (NMOP) in Vermont with Jenny Beck in 2011.

== Awards and recognition ==
In 2018, Alexander won an Arts and Letters Award in Music from the American Academy of Arts and Letters. She is the recipient of a 2007–08 Aaron Copland Award and a 2006 Guggenheim Fellowship. In 2009, she won the Roger Sessions Memorial Bogliasco Fellowship in Music and resided as Composer-in-Residence at the Liguria Study Center in Bogliasco, Italy. Other awards include a Radcliffe Fellowship at the Center for Advanced Study at Harvard University, a Computerworld Laureate Award from the Smithsonian Institution, a Composer's Fellowship from the National Endowment for the Arts, and the Rome Prize, as well as numerous ASCAP awards.

== Selected musical works ==
- Of Senses Steeped (2018) for carillon, premiered at the 2018 Rockefeller Chapel Carillon New Music Festival at the University of Chicago
- Of Reminiscence, premiered by the JACK Quartet
- Phantasmes (2017) for carillon and digital simulation of the Tsar Bell, composed for the University of Michigan Bicentennial Fall Festival
- Wanderers (2016) for solo double bass and chamber players, commissioned by the Fromm Music Foundation
- The Harbingers of Light (2012) for electronics, created with Juraj Kojs, Margaret Lancaster, and Jennifer Beattie
- AroundAbout (2007), for piano trio
- Totally Raw I (2006–2007), spectrally-generated sonic electronica
- In The Purest Air, Sapphirine (2006), a chamber concerto for electric jazz guitar soloist, premiered by Mark Dancigers and The NOW Ensemble
- Dreams and Reveries (2005), for percussion quartet
- From The Faraway Nearby (2004), for piano trio
- ...Mania REDUX! (2003), for virtual percussionist and controllist
- In Memoriam (2003), for vocal soloists and vocal ensemble, premiered by the Yale Camerata under the direction of Marguerite Brooks, with soloists Richard Lalli and Julia Blue Raspe
- Abstracted Cisms (2001), a multimedia performance piece for alternate controllers and performers based on the abstract shapes and contours in Willem de Kooning's painting Abstract XIII
- Like Long-Drawn Echoes from Afar Converging (1994) for flute, viola, cello, piano, and percussion. Commissioned by the Fromm Music Foundation and premiered by the California EAR Unit at the Los Angeles County Museum of Art
