= Lance Morrow =

American journalist (1939–2024)

- Born: Lance Thomas Morrow; September 21, 1939; Philadelphia, Pennsylvania, U.S.
- Died: November 29, 2024 (aged 85); Spencertown, New York, U.S.
- Education: Harvard University (BA)
- Occupations: Essayist; author; journalist
- Spouses: Brooke Wayne (divorced); Susan Brind (m. 1988)
- Children: 2
- Relatives: James K. Morrow (cousin)
- Writing career
- Period: 1963–2024

Lance Thomas Morrow (September 21, 1939 – November 29, 2024) was an American essayist and writer, chiefly for Time magazine, as well as the author of several books. He won the 1981 National Magazine Award for Essay and Criticism and was a finalist for the same award in 1991. He had the distinction of writing more "Man of the Year" articles than any other writer in the magazine's history and appeared on The Late Late Show with Craig Ferguson and The O'Reilly Factor. He was a professor of journalism and University Professor at Boston University.

== Early life ==
Lance Thomas Morrow was born in Philadelphia on September 21, 1939, and was raised in Washington D.C., where he attended Gonzaga College High School. His father, Hugh Morrow, was for many years a chief aide to New York Governor and later Vice President Nelson Rockefeller. Morrow graduated magna cum laude from Harvard University in 1963 with a BA in English literature.

== Career ==
Morrow joined Time in 1965 after a two-year stint with the now-defunct Washington Star. As a reporter, he covered the 1967 Detroit race riots, the Vietnam War, the Nixon administration and the Watergate scandal. He also penned several of Time's "Man of the Year" articles. Morrow had conservative and progressive-leaning views, with The Washington Post noting that he was skeptical of affirmative action while also supporting environmentalist policy.

In 1976, Morrow became a regular writer of Time's backpage essay. He won the National Magazine Award for his Time essays in 1981, was a finalist for the award in 1991 (for a cover essay on the subject of evil), and was among the Time writers who won the award in 2001, for their coverage of the September 11 attacks (in a special issue that closed on the afternoon of that day). In Morrow's award-winning essay, "The Case for Rage and Retribution", he wrote:

A day cannot live in infamy without the nourishment of rage. Let's have rage... Let America explore the rich reciprocal possibilities of the fatwa. A policy of focused brutality does not come easily to a self-conscious, self-indulgent, contradictory, diverse, humane nation with a short attention span. America needs to relearn a lost discipline, self-confident relentlessness and to relearn why human nature has equipped us all with a weapon (abhorred in decent peacetime societies) called hatred... This is the moment of clarity. Let the civilized toughen up, and let the uncivilized take their chances in the game they started."

Morrow was a professor at Boston University from 1996 to 2006, when he was asked to write the authorized biography of Henry Luce, the founder of Time magazine.

In 2018, he began contributing to City Journal magazine. He also contributed columns for The Wall Street Journal, and continued to write until the last months of his life.

== Personal life and death ==
Morrow lived in Spencertown, New York with his wife, Susan Brind Morrow, who is also an author. They married in 1988 after the dissolution of his first marriage, to Brooke Wayne. He and Wayne had two sons. His cousin was the science fiction writer James K. Morrow.

Beginning when he was 36, Morrow had four heart attacks during his life. After his second, when he was 53, he wrote a memoir entitled Heart.

Lance Morrow died at home from prostate cancer on November 29, 2024, at the age of 85.

== Bibliography ==
- The Chief: A Memoir of Fathers and Sons (1985)
- Fishing in the Tiber: Essays (1988)
- America: A Rediscovery (1989)
- Heart: A Memoir (1995)
- Evil: An Investigation (2003)
- The Best Year of Their Lives: Kennedy, Nixon, and Johnson in 1948: Learning the Secrets of Power (2005)
- Second Drafts of History: Essays (2006)
- God and Mammon: Chronicles of American Money (2020)
- The Noise of Typewriters: Remembering Journalism (2023)
