= Susan Brind Morrow =

American author and poet (born 1958)

- Born: 1958 (age 67–68); Geneva, New York, U.S.
- Education: Barnard College; Columbia University
- Occupations: Author; poet
- Spouse: Lance Morrow (m. 1988; died 2024)

Susan Brind Morrow (born 1958) is an American author and poet who has written extensively on language and metaphor drawn from the natural world. Morrow has published translations of Greek, Latin, and Arabic poetry, and hieroglyphic texts. She has written four non-fiction books, Water: Poems and Drawings (2023), The Dawning Moon of the Mind (2015), Wolves and Honey: a history of the natural world (2004), and The Name of Things (1997). She also wrote a play, “ Mr. Analogue 200.”

== Background ==
Susan Brind was born in Geneva, New York. She attended Barnard College then studied classics as an undergraduate and graduate student at Columbia University in New York. She also studied Arabic and worked intensively on hieroglyphic texts for six years as a student of Egyptology.

== Career ==
Morrow first went to Egypt as an archaeologist on the Dakhleh Oasis Project and continued to live and study as a foundation fellow living with the desert nomadic tribes between Egypt and Sudan. This decade of work became her first book, The Names of Things: A Passage in the Egyptian Desert. The book is a "travel writing and memoir threaded through with musings on the origins of words" which Annette Kobak says "manages to unlock a sense of the awe and poetry our most ancient ancestors must have felt in naming things for the first time". The book was partially inspired by the death of her younger brother. It was a finalist for the PEN: Martha Albrand Award for the Memoir in 1998. James Dickey praised her work, comparing it to the work of Stephen Crane, Robert Graves and Freya Stark.

Her second book, Wolves and Honey: a history of the natural world, is an exploratory memoir. Morrow covers many of her interests including theosophy, the Finger Lakes region, the start of Mormonism, and the lasting relationships humans have cultivated with the natural environment, and bee-keeping.

Her third book, The Dawning Moon of the Mind, Morrow argues that The Pyramid Texts are the “earliest body of written poetry and religious philosophy in the world”

Her most recent book, Water: Poems and Drawings, is a rich collection of poetry, watercolors, and pen-and-ink drawings that is grounded in a vibrant sensory experience of the natural world. Water is the first publication of the Sowell Collection Books series from Texas Tech University, a literary archive housing the papers of prominent twentieth and twenty-first century American writers whose work explores questions of land use and the environment; the nature of human and non-human communities; the intersection of scientific and spiritual values; and the fragility and resilience of the Earth.

Morrow was a fellow of the Crane-Rogers Foundation/Institute of Current World Affairs in Egypt and Sudan (1988–90), noted as a prominent member after she dispatched The Dawning Moon of Mind. She is a 2006 fellow of the Guggenheim Foundation. Morrow also has affiliations with the Lapham’s Quarterly Editorial Board Trustee and wrote an essay published on the website called The Turning Sky which detailed her accounts of translating various Egyptian texts. Morrow is a recipient of the 2022 Award in Literature from the American Academy of Arts and Letters, and a former fellow of the Guggenheim Foundation.

Morrow is on the editorial board of Lapham's Quarterly. Her papers are in the Sowell Collection of Literature, Community and the Natural World. Her work has appeared in Harper’s, the New York Times, The Nation, The Seneca Review, Peripheries: A Journal of Word and Image (Harvard Center for the Study of World Religions), Best American Poetry, and Lapham’s Quarterly.

== Personal life ==
In 1988, Brind married journalist Lance Morrow. They remained together until his death in 2024, and lived in Spencertown, New York.

== Bibliography ==
- Water: Poems and Drawings
- The Names of Things: A Passage in the Egyptian Desert
- Wolves and Honey: A Hidden History of the Natural World
- Home Ground: Language for an American Landscape (contributor)
- Mt. Analogue (2006) (play)
- The Dawning Moon of the Mind: Unlocking the Pyramid Texts (2015)
- The Turning Sky (2018)

== Honors and awards ==
- Guggenheim Foundation, Fellow 2006
- Sowell Collection, Texas Tech University, papers purchased 2007
- Pen/Martha Albrand Award for the Art of the Memoir, finalist 1998
- Crane Foundation/Institute of Current World Affairs, Fellow Egypt and Sudan, 1988–90
- New York Institute for the Humanities Fellow
- American Academy of Arts and Letters 2022 Award Winner
