= Nancy Lee Peluso =

American rural sociologist

Nancy Peluso
- Awards: Guggenheim Fellowship (2006)

Academic background
- Education: B.A., 1978, Friends World College; M.Sc., PhD., Sociology of Agriculture and Natural Resources, Cornell University
- Thesis: Rich forests, poor people and development: forest access control and resistance in Java (1988)

Academic work
- Institutions: Yale University; University of California, Berkeley

Nancy Lee Peluso is an American rural sociologist. She is the Henry J. Vaux Distinguished Professor of Forest Policy at the University of California, Berkeley. In 2006, she was awarded a Guggenheim Fellowship.

== Education ==
After earning her BA from Friends World College, Peluso joined the Man and Biosphere Research Project No. 1 in Indonesia. Upon her return, her main research focus was on Forest Politics and Agrarian Change in Southeast Asia. In 1984, she conducted her PhD dissertation research in Java, Indonesia and later published it in a book titled Rich Forests, Poor People: Resource Control and Resistance in Java.

== Academic career ==
Peluso taught at the University of California, Berkeley from 1990 to 1992 and was a Ciriacy-Wantrup Postdoctoral Fellow in Natural Resource Studies in the Energy Resource Group. In 1992, she was appointed an assistant professor of resource policy at Yale University.

Peluso coined the term 'counter-mapping' in 1995, having examined the implementation of two forest mapping strategies in Kalimantan. One set of maps belonged to state forest managers, and the international financial institutions that supported them, such as the World Bank. This strategy recognised mapping as a means of protecting local claims to territory and resources to a government that had previously ignored them. She returned to the University of California, Berkeley in 1996 as an associate professor in the Department of Environmental Science, Policy and Management.

In 2001, Peluso published Violent Environments through the Cornell University Press with Michael Watts. In 2003, she was the recipient of a Harry Frank Guggenheim Fellowship. Three years later, she was the recipient of a Harry Frank Guggenheim Fellowship in order to examine territoriality, violence, and the production of landscape history in West Kalimantan, Indonesia.

Pelusa was awarded Berkeley's 2012 Sarlo Graduate Student Mentoring Award for Senior Faculty Award. In 2015, Peluso was a Senior Fulbright Fellow in Indonesia, where she focused on illegal gold mining. She was also a co-investigator with the University of Hawaiʻi at Mānoa and the University of Indonesia for a new National Science Foundation grant examining labor migration and its impact on land use in Indonesia.

In 2017, Peluso received a National Science Foundation Geography and Spatial Sciences Program grant to study the impacts labor migration has on Indonesian land use policy and labor markets. Two years later, it was announced that Peluso would become the new Chair of the Center for Southeast Asia Studies beginning in the 2020–21 academic year. She was also the recipient of the Al Moumin Award in Environmental Peacebuilding.

== Selected publications ==
The following is a list of selected publications:

- Rich Forests, Poor People: Resource Control and Resistance in Java (1992)
- Borneo in Transition: People, Forests, Conservation and Development (1996)
- Introducing community forestry: annotated listings of topics and readings (2000)
- Violent Environments (2001, with Michael Watts)
- New frontiers of land control (2013)
