= Samuel D. Gruber =

Samuel D. Gruber (born 1956) is an American art and architectural historian and historic preservationist. He has written extensively on the architecture of the synagogue and is an expert and activist in the documentation, protection and preservation of historic Jewish sites and monuments.

== Early life and education ==
Gruber was born in Norristown, Pennsylvania and lives in Syracuse, New York. He attended the American Overseas School of Rome from which he graduated in 1973. His father, anthropologist Jacob W. Gruber was director of Temple University's Rome campus, and it was there that he developed his love or architecture. While there he studied art history with urban historian Allan Ceen. Gruber received his B.A. degree in medieval studies from Princeton University where he studied with Joseph Strayer, William Chester Jordan, Robert Bergman, David Coffin, Robert Hollander and other distinguished scholars. He received his M.A, M.Phil. and Ph.D. degrees from Columbia University in the history of art and archeology, where he studied with Richard Brilliant, Alfred Frazer, Jerrilynn Dodds, Howard Hibbard, David Rosand, Joseph Connors, George Collins and other professors. His master's paper was a study of early medieval and Longobard masonry in Italy. His doctoral dissertation was study of the architecture and urbanism of medieval Todi (Italy).

== Career ==
He is Director of Gruber Heritage Global which includes the Jewish Heritage Research Center (Syracuse, NY), a private consulting firm; and president of the not-for-profit organization International Survey of Jewish Monuments. From 1989 until 1995 he served as founding director of the Jewish Heritage Council of the World Monuments Fund and from 1998 through 2008 as Research Director of the U.S. Commission for the Preservation of America's Heritage Abroad. In these roles Gruber has been, in the words of journalist Bill Gladstone, "in the vanguard of an international movement to restore endangered Jewish heritage sites around the world." Since 2014 Gruber has been consultant to the Lost Shul Mural Project in Burlington, Vermont.

In the decade and a half following the fall of Communism in Central and Eastern Europe (1990-2005), Gruber organized and supervised for the World Monuments Fund and the U.S. Commission more than a dozen countrywide surveys of cultural heritage sites of significance to religious and ethnic minorities. These identified, mostly for the first time, thousands of previously unrecognized and undocumented synagogues, churches, mosques, cemeteries and Holocaust-related sites, almost all of which were visited by survey teams that described their condition. These projects included full or partial surveys of Jewish sites in Bosnia and Herzegovina, Bulgaria, the Czech Republic, Estonia, Hungary, Latvia, Lithuania, Moldova, Poland, Romania, Slovakia, Slovenia, and Ukraine; Roma sites in Poland; Old Believers sites in Lithuania; and Protestant Christian and Muslim sites in Bulgaria.

He is author or editor of numerous articles and survey reports about Jewish monuments, and is a frequent public lecturer in the United States and Europe. He has curated several exhibitions about Jewish architecture including the online "Life of the Synagogue" for the College of Charleston in 2015.

In 1990, for the World Monuments Fund, Gruber organized and chaired the first international conference on the preservation of Jewish historic sites. He curated the accompanying exhibition "The Future of Jewish Monuments" at the Joseph Gallery of Hebrew Union College-Jewish Institute of Religion. Since then he has participated and helped organize many related conferences and seminars including ones in Paris (1999), Prague (2004), and Bratislava (2009). In 2013 he was keynote speaker at the conference "Managing Immovable Jewish Heritage in Europe" held in Kraków, Poland. and in 2014 keynote speaker at the annual meeting of the Southern Jewish Historical Society held in Austin, Texas

Since 2001 he has been lecturer in Jewish Studies at Syracuse University. where he teaches courses on Jewish art and architecture. He has also taught at Temple, Binghamton, Cornell and Colgate Universities and Cazenovia and LeMoyne Colleges.

== Awards and honors ==
Gruber is a dellow of the American Academy in Rome. He is recipient of many grants individually, or for projects with which he is involved. Since 2006 he has received research grants from the James Marston Fitch Charitable Foundation, the AIA New York Chapter, and the Gladys Krieble Delmas Foundation.

== Community service ==
In addition to his work for the International Survey of Jewish Monuments, which he took over from Raina Fehl, Gruber serves on many charitable boards and advisory committees. He was executive director of the Preservation Association of Central New York in 1999–2000, and served as board president of the organization from 2004 through 2009. He has also served on the Facilities Community of Temple Society of Concord (Temple Concord) in Syracuse since 1998 for which he researched and wrote the National Register of Historic Places nomination in 2008 and co-chaired the Building Centennial Committee in 2010–11. Gruber has been active for many years in efforts to document, protect and preserve historic houses of worship in Central New York. He has provided historical and art commentary on South Presbyterian Church and Holy Trinity Church and serves on committees to preserve the former AME Zion church at 711 E. Fayette Committee and the Gustav Stickley House.

== Books ==
- American Synagogues: A Century of Architecture and Jewish Community By Samuel D. Gruber Photos by Paul Rocheleau Edited by Scott J. Tilden Rizzoli International Publications, 2003 ISBN 978-0847825493
- Synagogues, By Samuel D. Gruber, Metro Books, 1999 ISBN 978-1567997422
- Jewish Monuments in Slovenia: A Report for the United States Commission for the Preservation of America's Heritage Abroad, By Ruth Ellen Gruber, Samuel D Gruber, Jewish Heritage Research Center, 2003
- Jewish identity in contemporary architecture: Joods Historisch Museum, Amsterdam, By Angeli Sachs, Edward van Voolen, Samuel Gruber, Prestel, 2004 ISBN 978-3791330570
