= Diane Koenker =

American historian

Diane P. Koenker is Professor of History, with interests in modern Russian and Soviet history.

She earned A.B. in History, Grinnell College, 1969, A.M. in Comparative Studies in History, University of Michigan, 1971, and Ph.D. in History, University of Michigan, 1976

While at the University of Illinois at Urbana-Champaign she chaired the Department of History (2011-2015) and directed the Russian and East European Center (1990-1996). In 2018 she was appointed at University College London as Director of the School of Slavonic and East European Studies.

== Books authored ==
- 2013: Club Red: Vacation Travel and the Soviet Dream, Ithaca, Cornell University Press
- 2005: Republic of Labor:' Russian Printers and Soviet Socialism, 1918-1930, Ithaca, Cornell University Press
- 1989: Strikes and Revolution in Russia, 1917 (with William G. Rosenberg), Princeton, N.J., Princeton University Press
- 1981: Moscow Workers and the 1917 Revolution, Princeton, N.J., Princeton University Press

In addition to the authored books, she was an editor and co-editor of several books and an author of many articles.

== Honors ==
- 2018: ASEEES Distinguished Contributions Award.
- Outstanding Achievement Award, Association for Women in Slavic Studies, 2014
- 2006: Guggenheim Fellow
- Chester Higby Prize of the Modern European Section of the American Historical Association, for best article in preceding two years in Journal of Modern History, 2003
- Arnold O. Beckman Research Board Award, 1990-91, 2002-2003, 2012-13
