= LGBTQ parenting in Canada =

LGBT (lesbian, gay, bisexual, and transgender) parents in Canada have undergone significant progress in terms of both legal and social acceptance. Same-sex couples who wish for parenthood now enjoy equally the possibilities, responsibilities and rights of opposite-sex couples. Following the nationwide legalization of same-sex marriage in 2005, the number of LGBT families in Canada has increased substantially, paving the way for same-sex couples' aspirations of having their own children. Legal methods of assisted reproduction range from insemination via IVF through to surrogacy arrangements.

== Background ==
Queer was previously used as a derogatory term; in the 1990s it was re-appropriated by activists and today is used an umbrella term to describe persons who hold gender and sexual identities not understood as oppositional to heterosexual identities (see Heterosexuality). Queer parenting today has been made possible by activism beginning in the 1970s, when activists lobbied for the recognition of gay and lesbian parent’s rights. Changes in law, policy, access to assisted reproductive technology, and social attitudes have worked to recognize queer individuals and families as having both the ability and rights to parent. Recent studies have shown children of queer parents possess unique positive attributes, including and not limited to egalitarian attitudes (see egalitarianism), acceptance of social diversity, and high self-esteem.

Biological reproduction outside of heterosexual relationships has challenged the hegemonic Western concept of bio-centric familiar relationships. For many this has shifted the understanding of reproduction outside a heterosexual framework towards family and parenting as relational models. Family formations may include (and not limited to) single parents, paired parents, co-parents, polyamorous relationships, and numerous combinations of these forms.

== Biological Conception ==
Assisted Reproduction in Canada is governed under the Assisted Human Reproduction Act. This law regulates practices concerning assisted reproduction such as methods of conception and handling of reproductive tissues. The Act declares discrimination or withholding of assisted reproduction on the grounds of sexual orientation or marital status illegal. Additionally, some Canadian provinces and territories govern rights and responsibilities of parties involved in assisted reproduction. In some instances, queer families may require legal consultation to navigate these rights and responsibilities, resulting in delayed conception and associated costs. All interaction with Assisted Reproduction Clinics or Fertility clinics in Canada must be initiated by referral from a family physician. Although health care in Canada is a publicly funded system some assisted reproduction services have an associated cost which must be paid by clients, for example the freezing of sperm or eggs for future use. Queer parents may face additional challenges within assisted reproduction services, as these services were originally developed for heterosexual couples having difficulty conceiving compared to families who require assistance to conceive. Challenges may include forms which do not allow for correct gender identification, assumptions regarding relationship status and family configuration, uniformed counselors etc.

Two common methods of conception are insemination and in vitro fertilization. Families choosing to reproduce via insemination use fresh or frozen sperm to impregnate a biological mother whose egg will be used to conceive. Sperm for insemination may be inserted near the cervix, a process that can be completed at home; in some cases, sperm is inseminated into the uterus which is a clinical procedure. The use of sperm for insemination is regulated and in some cases a letter of permission from Health Canada prior to use. In vitro fertilization entails fertilizing an egg with sperm outside the body and placing the formed embryo into the uterus of the person who will carry the pregnancy. Here parents or donors may contribute biological tissue, in some cases a surrogate mother may be sought out (see Surrogacy). Since 2004, only altruistic surrogacy has been permitted by the Assisted Human Reproduction Act which allows surrogate mothers to be reimbursed for certain, legitimate expenses. This prohibition shall prevent (commercial) malpractice of reproduction which is illegal under Canadian law (see also Surrogacy laws in Canada). Health Canada, the department of the Canadian government which is responsible for national public health, is developing specific regulations about what constitutes a lawful expenditure. However, both altruistic and commercial is currently illegal in the province of Quebec.

Assisted reproductive technology is utilized by Queer parents within a variety of approaches. Decisions regarding who shall conceive and with what reproductive tissues may be made on the basis of; sexual orientation, gender identity, family configuration, available egg donors (see egg donation), availability of sperm donors (see sperm donation), racial/cultural consideration, reproductive health, and access to financial resources. Here novel approaches to creating biological relations can be accomplished by selecting which egg and sperm are used, for example using sperm and egg donors multiple times to create biological ties between children.

== Birth Registration ==
In Canada registration of birth is required to attain a birth certificate and social insurance number. Birth registration processes are set by individual provinces and may present unique challenges for Queer families. For example, in Ontario a female same sex couple using an unknown sperm donor may place both their names on the form automatically. If a known sperm donor is used the donor must forfeit their rights and the non-biological parent must legally declare second parentage or second parent adoption. This creates a lapse in legal recognition of the non-biological parent, the family maintains responsibility for legal fees.

=== Recent developments ===
Recent legal proceedings have provided progressive results for families who wish to incorporate more than two parents on a child's birth certificate. In 2007 an Ontario a judge granted three individuals parental status of a child. This case involved a lesbian couple who wished to have their known sperm donor recognized as a parent. This has opened the possibility of three parents to be allotted parental status on a case to case basis. The new Family Law Act in British Columbia, enacted in March 2013 allows for up to four parents to be listed on a birth registration. The act allows for donors to be listed as birth parents so long as the donor signs written consent prior to conception

== Mental Health of Non-Birth Parents ==
While biological health considerations for queer parents who conceive are easily visible, mental health concerns for non-biological parents may be more difficult to identify. Non-biological parents often struggle with the social perception that their role is considerably different or less important than the biological parent. This negative perception may be confounded by existing homophobic stigmas. Additionally infertility of the non-biological parent may also permanently disable the biological connection to parenting. These negative attitudes leave the non-biological parent at risk for negative mental health outcomes.

== Adoption ==
Queer parents wishing to adopt (see adoption) children into their families have three routes available.

=== Public Adoption ===
In Canada public adoption legislation, guidelines and eligibility are unique to each province. Prospective parents should familiarize themselves with practices within their home province as eligibility criteria vary. Public adoption agencies do not charge fees, although parents may be responsible for accessory costs. The process usually costs between $0–3000 CAD

=== Private Adoption ===
Private adoption is handled through third party agencies who work with birth parents to match children with adoptive parents. Private adoption costs between $10000- 20000 CAD

=== International Adoption ===
International Adoption is handled though agencies housed in their respective countries. Some international adoption agencies accept LGBTQ prospective parents. International adoption costs $25000+ CAD

== Social Support ==
For some Queer persons revealing the intent to become parents can force a social recognition of their sexual identity that may have been previously unacknowledged by others. In some instances of partnered relationships one partner, dubbed the "silent partner", may not actively express their sexual identity. Embarking on a path toward parenting may necessitate the silent partner's process of coming out. These acknowledgements are important to establish individual identity to fostering community building. In some cases non-normative gendered parents report taking years to build a supportive community to welcome a child into. Here persons may surround themselves with a "family of choice," who supports their family building process and provide a sense of belonging. In some cases new relationships can take a novel approach to recreating traditional familial relationships, i.e. elder supportive friends acting as grandparents. Social Support is also key when considering Assisted Human Reproduction as the emotional/physical/financial investment can be taxing, having a support network can lessen the burdens of these stresses

== Resources ==
There are multiple resources for queer parenting, queer blogs being one of them, as being part of a virtual parenting community can be rewarding as it can help in navigating the everyday struggles of parenting by giving advice, empathy or just a good laugh. Blogs and other forms of social media are a way of offering support by representing marginalized groups, such as the queer community. Interacting with blogs that discuss the particular challenges that pertain to queer parenthood can be inspirational and affirming, a source of comfort for anxious parents-to-be
