= Allen Wells (historian) =

American historian of Latin America (born 1951)

Allen Wells (born 1951) is an American historian. He is the emeritus Roger Howell Jr. Professor of History at Bowdoin College, where he specialized in Latin American history.

Born in 1951, Wells is a native of New York. He received a B.A. in history and Latin American studies from Binghamton University in 1973, as well as an M.A. and Ph.D. from Stony Brook University in 1974 and 1979. He taught at Appalachian State University for nine years before joining Bowdoin in 1988.

At Bowdoin, Wells was appointed to the Howell Chair in 2001. In 2006, he was awarded a Guggenheim Fellowship. During his tenure at Bowdoin, he was a developer of the Latin American studies program. He retired in 2019, though has continued to work on a book about the history of Bowdoin College.
