= Dare Baldwin =

American psychologist (born 1960)

- Citizenship: U.S.A. and Canada
- Occupation: Professor of Psychology
- Awards: 1994 Boyd McCandless Award from APA Division 7; 1995 John Merck Scholars Award; 1997 APA Distinguished Scientific Award for Early Career Contribution to Psychology; 2006-2007 James McKeen Cattell Sabbatical Fellowship; 2006 John Simon Guggenheim Memorial Fellowship

Academic background
- Education: University of California, Berkeley

Dare Ann Baldwin (born February 24, 1960) is a scientist known for her research on learning mechanisms and early social skills of infants and young children. Baldwin is a professor of psychology at Oregon University. Baldwin is the recipient of various awards including the 1994 Boyd McCandless Award from Division 7 of the American Psychological Association, 1995 John Merck Scholars Award, 1997 APA Distinguished Scientific Award for an Early Career Contribution to Psychology, 2006-2007 James McKeen Cattell Sabbatical Fellowship, 2006 John Simon Guggenheim Memorial Fellowship, 2006-2007 University of Oregon Fund for Faculty Excellence Award, and 2018 University of Oregon Faculty Research Award.

== Biography ==
Baldwin earned her B.A. in psychology at U.C. Berkeley in 1982. She attended graduate school at U.C. Santa Cruz where she obtained her M.Sc. in psychology in 1984. She obtained her Ph.D. in psychology with special designation in Cognitive Science at Stanford University in 1989.

From 1989 to 1992 Baldwin was a professor at the University of British Columbia. Since 1992, she works as a professor at the University of Oregon. From 2009 to 2013 she served as the Director of Graduate Studies in the Department of Psychology at the University of Oregon.

Baldwin was a 1999-2000 and 2016-2017 Fellow at the Center for Advanced Study in Behavioral Sciences at Stanford University. She became a Faculty-in-Residence at Clark Honors College of the University of Oregon in 2018.

Baldwin's research has been funded by the Bill & Melinda Gates Foundation, National Science Foundation, and National Institutes of Health.

== Research ==
Baldwin's primary research interest is related to how infant and young children acquire knowledge. Her current studies look at how infants understand human motion in relation to intentions and goals, and early language learning. She is the principal investigator at the Acquiring Minds Lab of the University of Oregon.

One of Baldwin's studies demonstrate that infants can readily detect disruptions in the structure of inherent intentional actions and then analyze the continuous action with respect to the structure. Baldwin and her colleagues suggest that the infant's ability to parse together behavior and structure is a prerequisite to understanding intentions.

In another one of Baldwin's studies, she examined how young children pick up emotional information from adults, showing that children who are skilled in social interactions are better at understanding emotional labels. This happens even though they don't directly relate to the object they are playing with.

== Representative publications ==
- Baldwin, D. A. (1991). Infants' contribution to the achievement of joint reference. Child Development, 62(5), 875–890. ISSN 0009-3920. PMID 1756664.
- Baldwin, D. A. (1995). Understanding the link between joint attention and language. Joint attention: Its origins and role in development, 131–158.
- Baldwin, D. A. (1993). Early referential understanding: Infants' ability to recognize referential acts for what they are. Developmental psychology, 29(5), 832. doi:10.1037/0012-1649.29.5.832. ISSN 1939-0599.
- Baldwin, D. A. (1993). Infants' ability to consult the speaker for clues to word reference. Journal of child language, 20(2), 395–418. doi:10.1017/s0305000900008345. ISSN 0305-0009. PMID 8376476.
