= Ana María Zeno =

Argentinian professor (1922–2011)

- Born: 7 June 1922; Rosario, Santa Fe
- Died: 1 August 2011 (aged 89); Rosario
- Education: National University of the Littoral
- Known for: Rosarina Association of Sexual Education, Kinsey Institute
- Scientific career
- Fields: gynaecologist

Ana María Zeno de Luque (1922–2011) was an Argentine professor, gynaecologist, sexologist, and women's rights activist who specialized in sexual education and social medicine. She was a founding member of the "Rosarina Association of Sexual Education" (ARES), and of the Kinsey Institute of Sexology Rosario.

== Life ==
She was the daughter of the surgeon Artemio Zeno and the niece of the surgeon Lelio Zeno. In 1948, she earned her medical degree from the National University of the Littoral, and in 1968, she was awarded a doctorate in medicine.

Zeno was a pioneer in the 1970s in the area of contraception. She wrote in opinion columns and published letters from readers in local and national newspapers. Together with her husband, the psychiatrist Dr. N. Luque, she established a home-centered medical practice.

Zeno was a pioneer in reproductive women's issues. When little was known about sexual education, Zeno promoted and developed counselors and professionals in the field. As a gynecologist, she encouraged the opening of spaces for the care of adolescents with sexual problems in hospitals, proclaiming the importance of talking about these issues and having policies on sexual and reproductive health.

In 1978, she was a founding member of the "Rosarina Association of Sexual Education" (ARES), and in 1983, the Kinsey Institute of Sexology Rosario.

She also held positions at the municipal, provincial, and national levels.

Although her daughter disappeared during Argentina's military dictatorship, Zeno never abandoned the struggle for women's rights.

== Sources ==
- Artemis. Monica Gogna. "What is not named, also it exists"
- The Capital. AM Zeno (28 March 2008). "Transvestism, and transsexualism"
- Lacapital.com.ar Paulina Schmidt: woman supplement (16 April 2006). "Tireless fighter"
- The Capital. AN Zeno (23 August 2008). "State Terrorism"
