= Ronald Schuchard =

- Title: Goodrich C. White Professor of English and Irish Studies, Emeritus
- Spouse: Marsha Keith Manatt (m. 1962)
- Awards: Guggenheim Fellowship; Fellow, American Academy of Arts and Sciences

Academic background
- Education: McMurry College; University of Texas at Austin

Academic work
- Discipline: Literary criticism
- Sub-discipline: Modernist literature Irish literature
- Institutions: Emory University
- Notable works: Eliot's Dark Angel (1999); The Last Minstrels (2008); The Complete Prose of T. S. Eliot

Ronald Schuchard is an American literary scholar. He is the Goodrich C. White Professor of English and Irish Studies, emeritus, at Emory University, where he taught from 1969 until his retirement in 2012. He is best known for his work on the modernist writers W. B. Yeats and T. S. Eliot.

Schuchard's monograph Eliot's Dark Angel (1999), a study of the intersections between Eliot's life and his poetry and criticism, won the Robert Penn Warren–Cleanth Brooks Award. His book The Last Minstrels published in 2009 was a study of Yeats's lifelong effort to revive an oral tradition of chanted verse. As an editor he brought Eliot's unpublished Clark and Turnbull lectures into print as The Varieties of Metaphysical Poetry (1993) and co-edited three volumes of The Collected Letters of W. B. Yeats with John Kelly. He later served as general editor of the eight-volume The Complete Prose of T. S. Eliot: The Critical Edition. For these editions, he was awarded the Modern Language Association's Morton N. Cohen Award and its Prize for a Distinguished Scholarly Edition.

At Emory, Schuchard advised the university's Rose Library on building its twentieth-century Irish and English manuscript collections. He founded the Richard Ellmann Lectures in Modern Literature, inaugurated in 1988. He also founded the T. S. Eliot International Summer School and directed the Yeats International Summer School. He received a Guggenheim Fellowship in 2006 and was elected a fellow of the American Academy of Arts and Sciences in 2012.

== Education and academic career ==
Born Walter Ronald Schuchard, he grew up in Abilene, in West Texas. He attended McMurry College in Abilene and the University of Texas at Austin (UTA). He graduated in 1961 and later completed a doctorate at UTA. In June 1962 he married Marsha Keith Manatt, and the couple took up teaching fellowships in Kampala, Uganda. That year he joined the United States Agency for International Development's Teachers for East Africa project. In March 1963 he received a graduate diploma in education from Makerere University College in Kampala. Subsequently, he served for two years as an education officer for the Kenyan government, teaching English and literature in Meru. He joined the faculty of Emory University in 1969, later being appointed to the Goodrich C. White Professorship of English; he became emeritus.

Schuchard was a faculty advisor to Emory's Stuart A. Rose Manuscript, Archives, and Rare Book Library. There he worked on developing its holdings of twentieth-century Irish and English literary manuscripts. He was also involved in building the university's poetry collections. Schuchard learned of the collector Raymond Danowski at the Grolier Club in New York in 1996, and persuaded him to give his library to Emory in 2004: some 60,000 volumes. He was also a former director of the Yeats International Summer School in Sligo, Ireland. He holds a permanent appointment as a Senior Research Fellow at the Institute of English Studies, University of London.

In 2022 the Harry Ransom Center at the University of Texas at Austin established the Ronald Schuchard Undergraduate Archival Research Prize in his honour.

== Scholarship ==
Schuchard's research centres on modern British and Irish literature, and in particular on the work of Yeats and Eliot. A number of his essays first appeared in journals before being gathered and reworked into his books.

=== Eliot's Dark Angel ===
Eliot's Dark Angel: Intersections of Life and Art was published in 1999. It gathers and reworks a series of Schuchard's previously published essays into a single study of the intersections between Eliot's life and his poetry and criticism. The book's title was drawn from Lionel Johnson's poem The Dark Angel, which Schuchard adopts as a governing motif for the figure of torment and inspiration he traces in Eliot's work. Central to the book is Schuchard's recovery of the syllabuses Eliot prepared for the university extension lectures he gave between 1916 and 1919. Reviewers singled it out as an important archival contribution. Other chapters examine the influence of T. E. Hulme and Jules Laforgue, the London music hall, Baudelaire and the theme of blasphemy, the "horrific moment" in Eliot's writing. Further, the book explores the presence of Ignatius of Loyola, George Herbert, and John of the Cross in his later poetry. The book is framed as a defence of biographical criticism against what Schuchard regarded as the reductive tendencies of contemporary theory. It won the Robert Penn Warren–Cleanth Brooks Award for Outstanding Literary Criticism and the South Atlantic Modern Language Association's SAMLA Studies Award.

The book was widely reviewed. In Christianity and Literature, John H. Timmerman called it a "milestone in Eliot criticism" and among the finest studies of the poet in a decade. However, he thought that the chapter on T. E. Hulme's influence was the most speculative in the collection. Joseph Dinunzio, in The Review of English Studies, called it "one of the best books on Eliot in recent years" and judged the recovered syllabuses a great contribution. However, he found the book to be overly reliant on Bertrand Russell's affair with Vivienne Eliot. Denis Donoghue reviewed the book in The Southern Review and admired individual chapters, particularly those on Eliot's comic sense and on John of the Cross. However, he remained unconvinced that the "dark angel" motif, which was used in the title of the book, was clarified. The most skeptical assessment was Stephen Thomson's review in The Modern Language Review. He argued that the book left its central term "life" unexamined and also wrote that the book read as a selection of biographical essays rather than a sustained monograph.

=== The Last Minstrels ===
The Last Minstrels: Yeats and the Revival of the Bardic Arts was published in 2008. This book described Yeats's attempt, together with Florence Farr and Arnold Dolmetsch, to revive the tradition of chanting and the oral practice of versifying speech, and to restore the poetic voice of the spoken word in the center of cultural life. Schuchard drew on a large body of new archival material, and argued how the experiments in verse-speaking of Yeats and Farr had influenced the development of early Imagist movement and the general discussion about free verse. The book won the Robert Rhodes Prize for an outstanding book on Irish literature from the American Conference for Irish Studies. It also received an honorable mention in the 2009 Modernist Studies Association book prize.

Mary Thuente, in her review in Modern Philology, called it an impressive capstone work that recovered what amounted to a lost literary movement, which was central to early twentieth-century poetry. Edward Neill, in The Modern Language Review, described Schuchard as "a virtuoso of the archive". However, he cautioned that the abundance of detail left little room to weigh which of Yeats's experiments had actually succeeded. The musicologist Harry White judged it in Music & Letters a "graceful and scholarly book". However, he added that he wished for fuller treatment of the composers Yeats worked with. In the Times Higher Education, Ian Patterson called the reconstruction "magnificently exhaustive". He singled out its rewriting of the debates of 1909–1915 over vers libre, symbolism, and Imagism, but he felt the book came into its own only after its first 250 pages. Choice rated the study "Essential". A reviewer in English Studies credited it with reshaping the conventional image of Yeats through its use of contemporary archival sources.

=== Debate over Eliot and antisemitism ===
Schuchard wrote an essay in the January 2003 issue of the journal Modernism/Modernity, where he argued that T. S. Eliot should be cleared of the charge of antisemitism that had long shadowed his reputation. In the essay, he cited a previously unknown cache of letters between Eliot and Horace Kallen, who was a Jewish-American professor of social thought at the New School. On Schuchard's account, Kallen was a lifelong friend of Eliot. The letters had been discovered in 1997 among Kallen's papers at the American Jewish Archives in Cincinnati. Schuchard drew on these letters and other materials to contend that during the early 1940s Eliot had worked with Kallen to help Jewish refugees from Germany and Austria resettle in Britain and America. He also added that Eliot later voiced support for the state of Israel, and that he was a "philo-Semite" rather than an antisemite.

The essay appeared with responses from six Eliot scholars: David Bromwich, Ronald Bush, Denis Donoghue, Anthony Julius, James Longenbach and Marjorie Perloff, along with a reply from Schuchard. It provoked international debate. Few scholars were persuaded. The charge against Eliot was based largely on the depiction of Jews in his poems including Gerontion and Burbank with a Baedeker, Bleistein with a Cigar, and also on a 1933 lecture in which he said that large numbers of freethinking Jews were undesirable. Julius, author of a 1995 study of Eliot and antisemitism, accused Schuchard of omissions, misreadings and a misuse of biographical material. He also held that critics who excused Eliot's antisemitism carried on his own contempt toward Jews. Perloff argued that Schuchard's own findings showed Eliot regarding Jews as Jews first and individuals second. Of the six respondents, only Donoghue accepted that Eliot was free of anti-Jewish prejudice but he felt that the letters would hardly change people's opinion. In his reply Schuchard wrote that his was the first essay to take Eliot's Jewish friendships seriously. He also added that discounting them distorted the record.

=== Editorial work ===
Schuchard's first major edition was titled The Varieties of Metaphysical Poetry. It brought Eliot's unpublished Clark Lectures (Cambridge, 1926) and Turnbull Lectures (Johns Hopkins, 1933) into print. Reviewers welcomed the long-delayed edition, however, they differed over its dense annotation. In The Sewanee Review, Steven Helmling called the volume "more than worth the wait". William H. Pritchard writing in the The American Scholar, found the introductions "deft and highly informative" but the heavy footnoting distracting. Christopher Lehmann-Haupt while writing in The New York Times called the editing "superb and exhaustive" and the volume an absorbing exercise in close reading. The poet Stephen Spender, who reviewed the book in The Daily Telegraph, praised the apparatus as immense and meticulous. However, he found that it could overwhelm the lectures and advised readers to take them first and return to the notes afterwards.

With John Kelly, Schuchard co-edited three volumes of The Collected Letters of W. B. Yeats for Oxford University Press: Volume III (1901–1904) in 1994, Volume IV (1905–1907) in 2005, and Volume V (1908–1910) in 2018. Volume IV of the series won the Modern Language Association's biennial Morton N. Cohen Award for a Distinguished Edition of Letters. Reviewing Volumes III and IV in English Literature in Transition, 1880–1920, K. P. S. Jochum called the editing "exemplary" and the annotations a rich context for Yeats's life and work. However, he cautioned that the letters themselves are of uneven literary interest. He also added that the density of Yeats's day-to-day theatrical business can make for wearing reading. Reviewing the third volume in the London Review of Books, Terry Eagleton called the co-edited edition a "scholarly masterpiece". He regarded it among the finest literary scholarship of its era, but noted that much of the correspondence itself was routine and yielded only the occasional revelation.

Schuchard also co-curated the Grolier Club exhibition and catalogue To Set the Darkness Echoing: An Exhibition of Irish Literature, 1950–2000 in 2002. In a notice in The Papers of the Bibliographical Society of America, a reviewer found the exhibition itself modest and not lavishly illustrated. However, he praised Schuchard's compact introduction as densely informative and worth reading.

Schuchard is the general editor of The Complete Prose of T. S. Eliot: The Critical Edition, which is an eight-volume edition gathering more than six thousand pages of Eliot's non-fiction prose. Most of the prose in the book was previously uncollected or unpublished. The project grew out of Schuchard's long association with Eliot's widow and literary executor, Valerie Eliot. She invited him to edit the Clark and Turnbull lectures in the 1980s and in 2006 commissioned the prose. The entire volume was too large to print in full, so it appeared as an annotated edition Project MUSE first. Later it appeared in a more limited print edition. Volume 2 of the edition won the Modernist Studies Association's prize for a distinguished edition.

The edition was anticipated well before publication. In The Guardian in 2007, the poet James Fenton wrote that admirers of Eliot needed a complete edition of his prose and declared himself impatient for it. The completed edition was widely reviewed. Don James McLaughlin, while writing in the Journal of Modern Literature, called the project "an extraordinary undertaking" and a marvellous achievement. Reviewing the first four volumes in the South Atlantic Review, Matt Seybold judged the edition a demanding but rewarding resource. However, he suggested its digital interface would benefit from more informative tables of contents. He also added that the volume should have a clearer marking of previously unpublished items. In The New Criterion, Denis Donoghue found the volumes richly annotated and dissented only on isolated points of interpretation. Assessing the final three volumes in The Hudson Review, William H. Pritchard praised the annotation.

== Founding of lecture series and summer schools ==
Schuchard is the founder of the Richard Ellmann Lectures in Modern Literature at Emory, named after Richard Ellmann. The series was inaugurated by Seamus Heaney in 1988. Umberto Eco delivered the series' twentieth-anniversary lectures in 2008, the year Schuchard stepped down as its director. He is also the founder of the T. S. Eliot International Summer School at the University of London, which he led from 2009 to 2013 and again from 2017 to 2018.

== Awards and honours ==
- 1975 - Fellowship, American Council of Learned Societies
- 1979 - Fulbright Scholarship
- 2006 - 2007 - Guggenheim Fellowship, used to begin work on The Complete Prose of T. S. Eliot
- 2008 - M. L. Rosenthal Award for distinguished contribution to Yeats studies, W. B. Yeats Society of New York
- 2012 - Fellow, American Academy of Arts and Sciences

== Selected publications ==
- Eliot, T. S. (1993). Schuchard, Ronald (ed.). The Varieties of Metaphysical Poetry. Faber and Faber.
- Yeats, W. B. (1994–2018). Kelly, John; Schuchard, Ronald (eds.). The Collected Letters of W. B. Yeats, Volumes III–V. Oxford University Press.
- Schuchard, Ronald (1999). Eliot's Dark Angel: Intersections of Life and Art. Oxford University Press. ISBN 0-19-510417-X.
- Schuchard, Ronald (2008). The Last Minstrels: Yeats and the Revival of the Bardic Arts. Oxford University Press. ISBN 978-0199230006.
- Eliot, T. S. (2014–2021). Schuchard, Ronald (ed.). The Complete Prose of T. S. Eliot: The Critical Edition. Johns Hopkins University Press and Faber and Faber.
