= Lugones (surname) =

Lugones is a surname. Notable people with the surname include:

- Jorge Rubén Lugones (born 1952), Argentine Roman Catholic bishop
- Leopoldo Lugones (1874–1938), Argentine writer
- Maria Lugones (1944–2020), Argentine philosopher
- Mario C. Lugones (1912–1970), Argentine film director
- Pirí Lugones (1925–1978), Argentine writer, granddaughter of Leopoldo
