= Dayna Hanson =

American filmmaker and choreographer

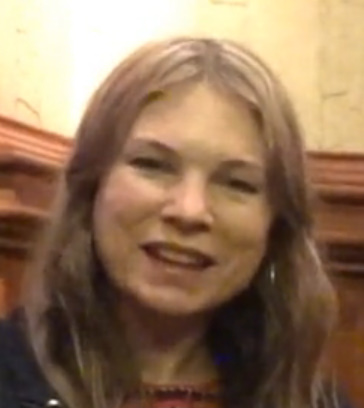
Hanson in 2013

Dayna Hanson is an American filmmaker, choreographer, and multidisciplinary artist based in Seattle, Washington. Hanson is a 2006 Guggenheim Fellow in Choreography and a 2011 United States Artists Fellow.

== Education ==
Hanson grew up in the Pacific Northwest and attended the University of Washington, where she studied with poet Colleen J. McElroy and literary translator Suzanne Jill Levine; she received the Milliman Prize for Short Fiction before earning a degree in English literature with a concentration in creative writing.

== Dance ==
Inspired by artists including The Wooster Group and Anne Teresa De Keersmaeker, she pivoted to dance in 1987, self-training as a choreographer and performing in various Seattle venues. In 1994, she teamed with choreographer Gaelen Hanson to form dance theater company 33 Fainting Spells.

33 Fainting Spells’ dance theater work, rhythmically complex and often informed by cinematic and literary source material, was presented in venues throughout the U.S. and in Europe between 1994 and 2006, when the company disbanded. 33 Fainting Spells’ work was noted for its complexity, precision and mystery, and for combining rigorous dance training and natural movement into a seamless performance vocabulary. In 1997, Elizabeth Zimmer wrote in The Village Voice, “33 Fainting Spells has its finger on the cultural zeitgeist as few American dance theater groups do."

The company also produced a dance film festival, “New Dance Cinema”, and created several short dance films, including “Measure”, produced by Carlo Scandiuzzi and edited by Lynn Shelton. According to Elizabeth Zimmer, it illustrates "the way the camera excels at revealing deep space, with a soft-shoe routine in a hallway". "Measure" is included in Tanz Digital's collection of historically significant dance films.

After 33 Fainting Spells, Hanson continued creating dance and performance work, including "Gloria’s Cause", a deconstruction of the American Revolution that premiered at On the Boards in Seattle before touring nationally, and, in 2013, "The Clay Duke", which examined the 2010 Panama City school board shootings.

== Film and television ==
Hanson’s debut feature film, "Improvement Club", premiered in the Narrative Competition at South by Southwest in 2013. Produced by Mel Eslyn, it fictionalized the making of “Gloria’s Cause” and featured the same cast of multidisciplinary artist and performers.

Hanson wrote, directed and choreographed the episode "Voyeurs" in the HBO and Duplass Brothers Productions anthology series "Room 104". Screen Rant praised the episode as "compelling and illuminating for 30 straight minutes", and Rachel Syme in The New Republic described the episode as "like nothing I’ve seen on television before."

In 2022, Hanson directed the legal thriller "Confession," which premiered at the Woodstock Film Festival and was released by Vertical Entertainment in 2023.

== Collaboration and nonprofit leadership ==
Hanson has collaborated with filmmakers such as Lynn Shelton, Kim Tae-yong, Sean Porter and Wes Hurley, musician Lori Goldston, choreographers including Heather Kravas and Peggy Piacenza and theater companies Rude Mechs and Pig Iron Theatre Company. In 2016, she co-founded Base, a nonprofit arts space in Seattle providing creative residencies and performance opportunities.

== Awards and recognition ==
Hanson has received numerous awards, including:

- MacDowell Fellowship, 2017
- Artist Trust Arts Innovator Award, 2012
- United States Artists Oliver Fellowship in Dance, 2011
- New England Foundation for the Arts National Dance Project Production Grant, 2010
