= Mónica Tarducci =

Argentine anthropologist

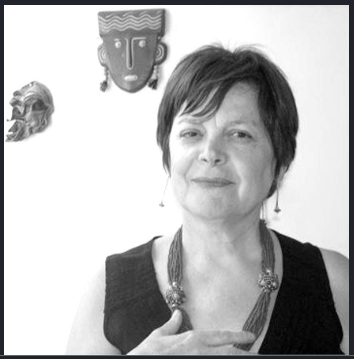
- Occupation: Anthropologist
- Known for: Feminist anthropology, family studies in Argentina
- Notable work: La Adopción: Una Aproximación Desde La Antropología Del Parentesco.

Mónica Tarducci is an Argentine anthropologist and feminist activist. Her research focuses on the intersections of gender and religion, and on the adoption of children in the province of Misiones. Tarducci currently teaches at the Universidad de Buenos Aires and at the Universidad Nacional de San Martín.

== Education ==
Tarducci received her undergraduate and Ph.D degrees from the Universidad de Buenos Aires.

== Activism ==
Tarducci has been involved with feminist activism in Argentina since the early 1980s. In 1986, as a part of the feminist organization Women in Movement (Mujeres en Movimiento), she was a part of the first National Encounter for Women (Encuentro Nacional de Mujeres) in Argentina, which happens to this day. She was the keynote speaker for the 2015 Jornadas de Debate Feminista —a Latin American encounter of feminist activists and academics which happens since 2014. In it she highlighted the role of the feminist movement in the fall of the Argentine dictatorship as well as its fundamental role in opening up the world of academia to the possibilities of sexuality, gender and queer theory.

Additionally, Tarducci has appeared in several TV shows and interviews in Argentina, going as far back as the 1980s. Amongst her biggest platforms, is the abortion legalization movement in Argentina.

== Work ==
Between 2006 and 2009, Tarducci conducted an extensive field research on the patterns of adoption in Misiones, a province of Argentina which borders Brazil and Paraguay.

As a professor in the Universidad de Buenos Aires and in the Universidad Nacional de San Martín, Tarducci teaches classes on "family studies," in which she analyzes the familial dynamics following her research with adoption and queer parenting. She also offers open courses and seminars on topics from ethnography to the history of feminism. In an interview to iSel TV, she has described herself as a "secular missionary, spreading knowledge through different contexts."

== Publications ==
- La Adopción: Una Aproximación Desde La Antropología Del Parentesco.
- Maternidades en el siglo XXI
- Feminismo, Lesbianismo y Maternidad en Argentina
