= Hilary Wilder =

American visual artist

- Education: University of Wisconsin, Madison; Bates College
- Known for: Painting, installation art, sculpture, video
- Awards: Guggenheim Fellowship, Pollock-Krasner Foundation
- Website: Hilary Wilder

Hilary Wilder, Violet in Rome (Rocks and Bullets), oil, acrylic and embroidery wool on canvas, 40" x 30", 2019.

Hilary Wilder is an American visual artist and educator based in Richmond, Virginia. She is primarily known for painting and installation art, but has also worked in sculpture and video. Her art employs wide-ranging, familiar visual languages—for example, from landscape and abstract painting and modern design—to explore how personal experience, historical events and places are represented, and sometimes fictionalized, misunderstood or idealized.

Wilder's work has been recognized by the John S. Guggenheim and Pollock-Krasner foundations and belongs to the public art collection of the Museum of Fine Arts, Houston (MFAH). She has exhibited at the Virginia Museum of Fine Arts, deCordova Sculpture Park and Museum, MFAH and Contemporary Arts Museum Houston, among other venues.

== Biography and career ==
Wilder studied art at Bates College in Maine and at the University of Wisconsin, Madison, where she earned an MFA in 2001.

She has had solo exhibitions at the Atlanta Contemporary Art Center (2006), Open Satellite (2008, Seattle), The Suburban (2010, Oak Park, IL), MFAH (2017), Virginia Museum of Fine Arts (2019), and the Hiram Butler Devin Borden (later Devin Borden) Gallery in Houston (2003–15), among other venues.

Wilder is a professor in the School of the Arts at Virginia Commonwealth University, where she has taught since 2007. Prior to that she taught at Princeton University, the University of Houston and the University of Texas, San Antonio.

== Work and reception ==
Wilder's paintings, installations and sculptures are often characterized by a central tension between representation and abstraction—for example, mixing elements of the picturesque 19th-century Romantic style and the modernist abstract grid—that signals competing impulses of a human desire for order and the chaos of the cosmos.

In earlier paintings, Wilder created images of manmade and natural disasters, employing the sublime language of painters such as Caspar David Friedrich, J.M.W. Turner and the Hudson River School. Reviewers suggest that despite their atmospherics and complex brushwork, these apocalyptic images registered skepticism for such idealized visions through subtle formal disruptions and insertions of graphic shapes, irregular grids, decorative patterns and historical motifs. Wilder's impermanent, site-specific installations offered a similar critique, revealing the "naturalness" of representational painting as a construction by incorporating on-site architectural elements (walls, electrical sockets) as compositional elements or spilling contents onto the floor. Her later work has shifted in subject matter toward modern architecture and interior design, in pieces that incorporate multiple views, sources and disciplines to construct complex narratives.

=== Specific artworks and exhibitions ===
Wilder's landscape-based work in the 2000s often focused critically on constructed moments of transformation, revealing disparities between representations of catastrophes and the profound upheaval they caused, events and memory. Art Papers critic Michelle White wrote, ""For Wilder, the formal and conceptual contradictions posed by the landscape are therefore the perfect tools to question the meaning of place and the dissonance that occurs when the real stumbles upon the ideal." Artlies critic John Devine wrote that her largely abstract paintings "explor[e] the border between order and disorder, tranquility and turbulence, stability and volatility—in short, flux."

In several Installations, Wilder created immersive environments with representational and abstract forms extending from paintings into gallery spaces. Responding to news photos of a Laguna Beach wildfire in Laguna (2004), she combined landscape paintings, disruptive color fields applied to walls, and agitated geometric forms interrupting both elements. The landscapes of Courting Disaster (2006) were loosely based on Ernest Shackleton's harrowing account of the Endurance Arctic expeditions. In "Nearer to Thee" (2008)—its title a reference to the Titanic—she explored the speculative desire for life-changing experience through three large, site-specific paintings, prints and a video.

Wilder's subsequent work has incorporated elements, themes and patterns from modern architecture, interior design and domestic objects (e.g., Black and Brown Chair (After Rietveld), 2015). Her exhibition "Ornament and Crime" (2010) used a 1909 essay by architect Adolph Loos condemning the use of ornamentation as "degenerate" as a touchstone; its work combining bold pattern, minimal forms and mass-produced materials was described in Artlies as "a clever, wistful commentary on the battles once waged over art and ornament" (e.g., An Immodern Proposal #1 and 2). In the installation Greatest American Hero (Thoreau's Desk Eight Times) (2014), Wilder offered a playful, questioning take on Thoreau as wilderness man through paper and plastic sculptural reworkings of his writing desk at Walden Pond.

Wilder's later painting took on a more fractured, collage-like appearance, juxtaposing images of nature, abstract pattern, trompe l'oeil effects and multiple views. In her 2019 exhibition, "They Bring Flowers," she presented paintings inspired by narratives drawn from 20th-century architecture, world history, art and mythology—each of which described an encounter between a woman and a specific system or individual that aimed to diminish her (e.g., Violet in Rome (Rocks and Bullets), 2019).

== Collections and recognition ==
Wilder has been awarded a Guggenheim Fellowship (2006), a Pollock-Krasner Foundation grant (2007), and fellowships from the Virginia Museum of Fine Arts (2009; 2018) and Museum of Fine Arts, Houston (2002–04). She has received artist residencies from Cow House Studios (Ireland), Galveston Artist Residency, the Ingmar Bergman Estate (Sweden), Jentel Arts, NES Artist Residency (Iceland) and Ucross Foundation. Her work belongs to the public art collections of the Museum of Fine Arts, Houston and U.S. Department of State.

Her videos were screened at the Pacific Film Archive and Chicago International Film Festival, where she was awarded its Gold Plaque in the experimental short video category in 2001.
