= Lugones, Santiago del Estero =

Coordinates: 28°20′S 63°21′W

Lugones (Santiago del Estero)
- Municipality and village
- Interactive map of Lugones (Santiago del Estero)
- Country: Argentina
- Province: Santiago del Estero
- Time zone: UTC−3 (ART)

Lugones (Santiago del Estero) is a municipality and village in Santiago del Estero in Argentina.

At the 2001 census [INDEC] it had 877 inhabitants, which represents an increase of 34.9% over the 650 in previous 1991 census [INDEC].
