= Janis Mattox =

- Born: March 18, 1949 (age 77); Saint Paul, Minnesota, U.S.
- Education: University of Minnesota; Northwestern University
- Occupations: Composer; pianist
- Awards: Guggenheim Fellowship (2006)
- Musical career
- Genres: Computer music

Janis Mattox (born March 18, 1949) is an American composer and pianist. An early creator of computer music, she is a 2006 Guggenheim Fellow.

== Biography ==
Janis Mattox was born on March 18, 1949 in Saint Paul, Minnesota. She obtained her BA at the University of Minnesota in 1972 and her MA at Northwestern University in 1974.

Mattox moved to the Center for Computer Research in Music and Acoustics (CCRMA), where she started using computer technology to create her work in 1978. She composed several pieces featuring computerized music; one of these pieces, "Shaman", was sampled in the 1983 album The Digital Domain: A Demonstration. She performed a hymn on Naut Humon's album Swarm of Doves, which Paul Verna of Billboard called one of the album's highlights. In 2002, she created the hour-long electronic piece Solombra, inspired by poet Cecília Meireles. In 2006, she was awarded a Guggenheim Fellowship. She is also a Silicon Valley Fellow. Elizabeth Hinkle-Turner said that some of Mattox's pieces "reflect her interest in combining live performers with computer-generated and processed sounds in an all-encompassing aural and visual experience".

She also does video art, with one of them being the 1992 piece Book of Shadows, which won several film festival awards throughout the United States. She has also performed as a pianist, particularly for the Good Sound Band. She has also worked as a teacher, including in computer music at CCRMA or in piano. She also worked for the Good Sound Foundation as a project consultant.

Her husband Loren Rush is a composer. She is based in Woodside, California.
