= Marcela Nari =

Argentine historian and writer

Marcela Nari (1965–2000) was an Argentine historian and writer who is remembered for her work at the University of Buenos Aires on the history of women and feminism in Argentina.

== Biography ==
Nari was a writer on the history of feminism in Argentina. The author of Políticas de Maternidad y Maternalismo Político. Buenos Aires, 1890–1940 on political motherhood in Argentina, she had a PhD in History and was a specialist in women's studies at the National University in Buenos Aires. In addition to founding the Instituto Interdisciplinario de Estudios de Género (Interdisciplinary Institute on Gender Studies), she promoted research and coordination at other academic centres. Research topics included the history of women and feminism in Argentina, and the treatment of women in prison during maternity and in motherhood. She also published dozens of articles in Argentine and foreign journals including Feminaria, mujer/fempress, Latin American Perspectives, Mora, Toda es Historia, Razón y Revolución and the Instituto Ravignani's Boletín.

In her work, Nari demonstrated that inspired by the need to populate the country, between 1890 and 1940 doctors and legislators tried to control women's maternal roles drawing where possible on religious considerations.
