= Jacob W. Gruber =

American anthropologist (1921–2019)

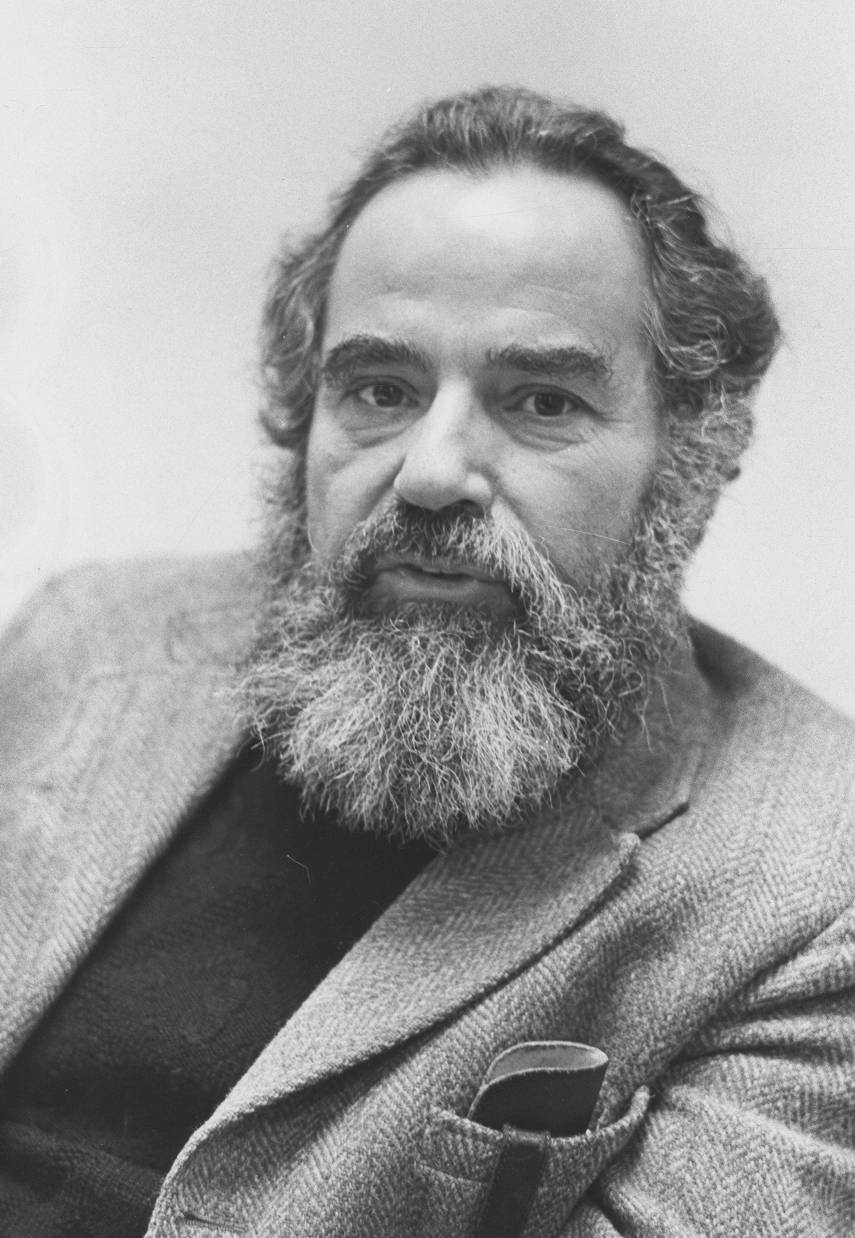
- Dr. Jacob Gruber
- Born: February 26, 1921; Pittsburgh, Pennsylvania
- Died: June 2, 2019 (aged 98)
- Education: Oberlin College
- Occupations: Anthropologist, archaeologist, educator, historian of science

Jacob William Gruber (February 26, 1921 – June 2, 2019) was an American anthropologist, archaeologist, historian of science and educator.

== Biography ==
Gruber was born in Pittsburgh, Pennsylvania on February 26, 1921, and grew up in Akron, Ohio as one of seven children. He attended Buchtel High School and received a bachelor's degree from Oberlin College in 1942, with honors in Classical Archaeology, and was elected a member of Phi Beta Kappa. He was drafted into the United States Army upon graduation, and served as a member of the 254th Engineer Supply Company of the Persian Gulf Command, based in Iran, from 1942 to 1945, and subsequently returned to Oberlin where he received his M.A. degree in Sociology and Anthropology in 1947. His thesis was Three Aspects of Early Iron Age Culture in Greece.

He received his Ph.D. in anthropology at the University of Pennsylvania, under Loren Eisley. He also studied with ethnographers Frank Speck and Alfred Irving Hallowell. He spent the summers of 1954 and 1955 visiting Iroquois reservations in New York State studying ceremonial masks, staying at the Allegany Reservation near Salamanca, New York in 1955. His dissertation on 19th century naturalist St. George Jackson Mivart later became the book A Conscience in Conflict: The Life of St. George Jackson Mivart. He died in June 2019 at the age of 98.

== History of Science ==
Gruber went on to become a specialist in the history of 19th-century natural sciences, writing on Thomas Henry Huxley, Charles Darwin, and especially Richard Owen, founder of the British Museum of Natural History. Over a period of nearly two decades Gruber located, redacted, and edited the extensive extant Owen correspondence.

In 1984 Gruber was a Fulbright Scholar at the Alexander Turnbull Library in Wellington, New Zealand, where he researched the history of the discovery and description of the moa.

== Professional career ==
He was emeritus Professor at Temple University in Philadelphia, where he taught from 1947 through 1982. At Temple, he founded the Department of Anthropology in 1964 and served as department chair from 1964 to 1970, and oversaw the rapid growth of the department through the 1960s. Beginning in 1955 he developed its continuing program of archaeological field sessions through which he directed over a dozen excavations and helped pioneer the field of historic archaeology in the Northeastern United States.

From 1970 to 1973 he was Founding Director of the Temple's Liberal Arts Program in Rome, Italy. In Rome he established Temple's long running liberal arts program and instituted a program of student tours, many of which he led to southern Italy. He recruited many young Italian scholars to teach at Temple alongside their American counterparts. Following his tenure in Rome he maintained close contacts with Italy, returning often to continue ethnographic work in Calabria and, following his retirement from teaching, dividing his time between the United States and a farmhouse in Umbria that he and his wife restored.

Returning from Italy, he was appointed chairman of the Pennsylvania Historical and Museum Commission by Governor Milton Shapp and presided over the commission during the active years around the national bicentennial celebration in 1976. In 1979 Gruber presided over the dedication of any historical marker commemorating the West Chester African-American artist Horace Pippin. In addition to archaeology, his primary field of interest is the 19th-century history of science, particularly that in Great Britain. His Ph.D. dissertation, and later book, focused on the 19th-century English natural scientist St. George Jackson Mivart. Gruber conducted many years of research on the life and work of the comparative anatomist Sir Richard Owen, an anti-Darwinist who was the founder of the British Museum of Natural History, and created a catalog of Owen's extensive correspondence.

== Archaeology ==
Gruber began archaeological as a student at Oberlin College in 1941, when he and Prof. h. B. May led a small excavation of an Erie Indian camp-site and burial ground. Gruber expanded his archaeological work while teaching at Temple University in the 1950s and continued to excavate prehistoric and historic sites through the Northeast United States through the 1970s. He developed Temple's field school program that trained student archaeologists during summer excavations and continuing artifact processing and analysis in the Anthropology Lab during the year. "The only way kids can learn about anthropology is by getting their hands dirty," he told a reporter in 1965. In 1966 he led a team of American students to collaborate at the prehistoric excavation at Bylany, Czechoslovakia. It was a rare educational and cultural exchange with a Communist country at that time, and forged long lasting friendships with Czech archaeologists and anthropologists.

Gruber's most extensive excavation of the 1960s was the Mohr Site, a former Susquehannock Indian village near Lancaster, Pennsylvania. In the mid-1970s Gruber led Temple students to excavate Assunpink Creek Site in Mercer county, New Jersey, before the construction of a dam. Gruber is recognized as one of the pioneers in historic archeology in the United States. Working with National Park Service archaeologist John L. Cotter, he conducted a series of archaeological excavations in historic Philadelphia beginning in the late 1950s during the period of urban renewal that saw the demolition of many old buildings. One of the earliest was the excavation of a privy at 315-317 Walnut Street, the site of the house of Dr. William McIlvaine. He also led the excavations of the Allegheny Portage Railroad in Western Pennsylvania, the First French Settlement in the New World at Saint Croix Island, Maine, and Fort Putnam at West Point.

- Buri Site (Birmingham, New Jersey), 1955
- Study of Huron Ossuary Remains, ca. 1957
- Schacht Site, Wyoming Valley, Pennsylvania, 1961
- 315-17 Walnut Street, Philadelphia, 1962
- Mohr Site, Bainbridge, Pennsylvania, 1963 -
- Archaeological Survey Along the Right-of-Way of FA1-1, State of Delaware, 1965 (?)
- Bylany, Czechoslovakia (1966)
- Antonio Site, Pennsylvania
- St. Croix Island, Maine, 1969-70
- Assunpink Creek, New Jersey, 1976
- Fort Putnam, West Point, New York

== Ethnography ==
In the 1970s, when in Rome, Gruber worked with Italian colleagues Tullio Tentori and Carla Bianca, to explore Southern Italy, and for many years conducted ethnographic investigations in the small town of Nocara, Calabria and the surrounding region. His interest focused on religious festivals, especially the annual procession of the Madonna in Nocara.

== Books ==
- Jacob W. Gruber, A Conscience in Conflict: The Life of St. George Jackson Mivart, Philadelphia: Temple University Publications, New York: Columbia University Press,1960.
- Jacob W. Gruber, (ed.), The Philadelphia Anthropological Society: Papers Presented on its Golden Anniversary, Temple University Publications. New York: Columbia University Press, 1967
- Jacob W. Gruber and John C. Thackray, Richard Owen Commemoration: Three Studies. London: Natural History Museum Publications, 1992.
