= Mirta Zaida Lobato =

Argentine historian (born 1948)

Dr. Mirta Zaida Lobato
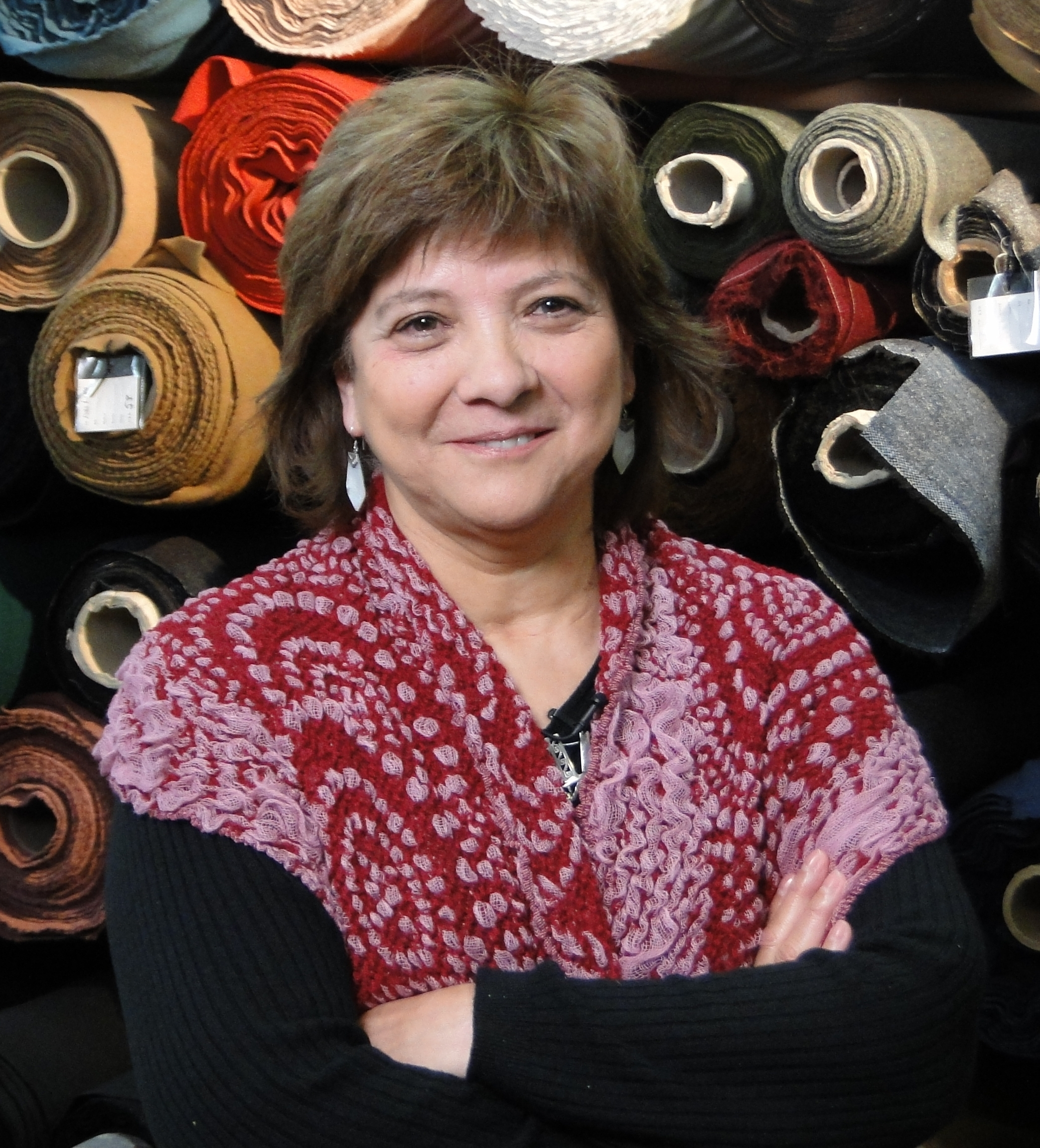
- Born: May 1, 1948 (age 78); Córdoba, Argentina,
- Other name: Mirta Zaida Lobato de Suriano
- Occupations: historian; essayist; full professor
- Spouse: Juan Suriano
- Children: Lisandro Martín Suriano
- Awards: Guggenheim Fellowship

Academic background
- Education: Ph.D., History
- Alma mater: University of Buenos Aires
- Thesis: La vida en las fábricas: trabajo, protesta y política en una comunidad obrera, Berisso (1904-1970)

Academic work
- Institutions: University of Buenos Aires
- Notable ideas: Founder, "Área Interdisciplinaria de Estudios de la Mujer" (English: Interdisciplinary Area of Women's Studies) (AIEM)

Mirta Zaida Lobato (Córdoba, May 1, 1948) is an Argentine historian, essayist, and full professor specializing in the social, cultural and political history of the world of work and gender relations in Argentina and Latin America in the 20th century. Lobato was the founder of "Área Interdisciplinaria de Estudios de la Mujer" (English: Interdisciplinary Area of Women's Studies) (AIEM). She was awarded a Guggenheim Fellowship in 2006.

== Early life and education ==
Mirta Zaida Lobato was born in Córdoba, Argentina, May 1, 1948.

She completed her secondary studies at the Escuela Normal Nacional Regional República del Ecuador in the city of Frías, Santiago del Estero. Later, she moved to Buenos Aires where she worked in different industrial and commercial activities. She studied at the Faculty of Philosophy and Letters of the University of Buenos Aires (UBA). In 1999, she presented her doctoral thesis at the Faculty of Philosophy and Letters of UBA entitled, La vida en las fábricas: trabajo, protesta y política en una comunidad obrera, Berisso (1904-1970) (English: Life in the factories: work, protest and politics in a working class community, Berisso (1904-1970)) and defended it in 2000, earning a Ph.D. in history.

== Career and research ==
In 1979, she obtained the title of professor in history, Faculty of Philosophy and Letters. Between 1982 and 1985, she worked in middle schools and teacher training institutes in Buenos Aires Province.

She is an associate professor at the UBA, specializing in social, cultural and political history of the world of work and gender relations in Argentina and Latin America in the 20th century, and a researcher at the "Programa de Estudios de Historia Económica y Social Americana" (English: Economic History Study Program and Social American) (PEHESA) since its incorporation to the Faculty of Philosophy and Letters of the UBA; she is currently a member of its board of directors and between 1997 and 1998, she coordinated its activities. She was part of the group of researchers who created the "Instituto Interdisciplinario de Estudios de Género" (English: Interdisciplinary Institute for Gender Studies) (IIEGE) at this faculty, where she directs the activities of the "Archivo Imágenes y Palabras de Mujeres" (English: Women's Images and Words Archive) (APIM).

She was part of the founding group and the editorial committee of the history magazine, Entrepasados, and is a member of the editorial committee of the magazine, Mora, of the Interdisciplinary Institute for Gender Studies of the Faculty of Philosophy and Letters of UBA.

Since 1985, she has been a professor of Argentine History at the Faculty of Philosophy and Letters of UBA, and has taught doctoral and postgraduate courses at various centers of higher education, such as UBA, National University of La Plata, National University of Rosario, University of San Andrés, Latin American Faculty of Social Sciences, National University of Mar del Plata, National University of General San Martín, University of the Republic (Uruguay), University of Chile, and University of Cologne (Germany).

In 1992, Lobato founded the "Área Interdisciplinaria de Estudios de la Mujer" (English: Interdisciplinary Area of Women's Studies) (AIEM), bringing together professors from the areas of Anthropology, Arts, Classics, Education, History, Languages, and Philosophy. At the Interdisciplinary Institute for Gender Studies (IIEGE) of the Faculty of Philosophy and Letters, she founded and directs the Women's Words and Images Archive (APIM) working group whose objectives are to value research in the human sciences, recover and preserve words and images of women, promote democratization in access to information, and favor the teaching of history from a perspective that integrates the gender dimension, as well as favor equal opportunities in education without distinctions of gender, race, social class, or age.

== Personal life ==
Lobato married the social historian Juan Suriano (1948-2018), an expert on Argentine anarchism. They have a son, Lisandro Martín Suriano.

== Awards and honours ==
- 2006, Guggenheim Fellowship

== Selected works ==
=== Books ===
- Mujer, trabajo y ciudadanía (in Spanish). Consejo Latinoamericano de Ciencias Sociales - C.L.A.C.S.O. 1996. ISBN 978-950-9231-39-9. (co-author)
- Política, médicos y enfermedades - Lecturas de historia de la salud en la Argentina (in Spanish). Biblos. 1996. ISBN 978-950-786-127-7.
- Atlas histórico de la Argentina (in Spanish). Sudamericana. 2000. ISBN 978-950-07-1717-5. (with Juan Suriano)
- Nueva historia argentina - Progreso, la modernización 1880-1916 (in Spanish). Sudamericana. 2000. ISBN 978-950-07-1725-0.
- La vida en las fábricas (in Spanish). Prometeo Libros. 2001. ISBN 978-950-9217-06-5.
- La protesta social (in Spanish). Fondo de Cultura Económica. 2003. ISBN 978-950-557-572-5.
- María Eva Duarte de Perón. Evita (1919-1952) (in Spanish). Madrid: Ediciones del Orto. 2003. ISBN 9788479233150.
- Cuando las mujeres reinaban - Belleza, género y poder en la Argentina del siglo XX (in Spanish). Biblos. 2005. ISBN 978-950-786-460-5. (co-author)
- Diecisiete de Octubre de 1945 - Antes, durante y después (in Spanish). Lumiere. 2005. ISBN 978-950-9603-84-4. (Participation in collective work.)
- Fotografía, memoria y género (in Spanish). Edición del Autor. 2005. ISBN 978-987-05-0332-3.
- Las políticas sociales en perspectiva histórica - Argentina, 1870-1952 (in Spanish). Prometeo Libros. 2006. ISBN 978-987-574-100-3. (Participation in collective work.)
- Historia de las trabajadoras en la Argentina (1869-1960) (in Spanish). Edhasa. 2007. ISBN 978-950-9009-89-9.
- Las mujeres tienen derechos? - Política y ciudadanía en la historia argentina reciente (in Spanish). Capital Intelectual. 2008. ISBN 978-987-614-055-3.
- Argentina, la construcción de un país (in Spanish). Sudamericana. 2009. ISBN 978-950-07-3038-9. (Participation in collective work.)
- La prensa obrera (in Spanish). Edhasa. 2009. ISBN 978-987-628-067-9.
- Buenos Aires. Manifestaciones, fiestas y rituales en el siglo XX (in Spanish). Biblos. 2011. ISBN 978-950-786-896-2. (editor)
- Formas de ciudadanía en América Latina (in Spanish). Vervuert Verlagsges. 2014. ISBN 9783954873227.
- Trabajo y Estado - Las instituciones laborales en la Argentina en la primera mitad del siglo XX (in Spanish). Edhasa. 2014. ISBN 978-987-628-279-6. (co-author)
- Historia, ¿para qué? (in Spanish). Universidad Nacional de General Sarmiento. 2014. ISBN 978-987-630-171-8. (Participation in collective work.)
- Americanización, Estados Unidos y América Latina en el siglo XX - Transferencias económicas, tecnológicas y culturales (in Spanish). Universidad Nacional de Tres de Febrero. 2014. ISBN 978-987-1889-38-9. (Participación en obra colectiva.)
- La sociedad del trabajo - Las instituciones laborales en la Argentina (1900-1955) (in Spanish). Edhasa. 2014. ISBN 978-987-628-279-6. (co-author)
- Antología del pensamiento crítico argentino contemporáneo (in Spanish). CLACSO. 2015. ISBN 978-987-722-111-4. (Participation in collective work.)
- Infancias argentinas (in Spanish). Edhasa. 2018. ISBN 978-987-628-500-1.

== Filmography ==
=== Documentaries ===
- 2008, De Alpargatas. Historias de trabajo
- 2005, Compañeras reinas
