= Planas (surname) =

Planas is a surname. Notable people with the surname include:

- Alba Planas (born 2000), Spanish actress
- Alfred Planas (born 1996), Spanish association football player
- Ana María Fernández Planas (1968–2021), Spanish philologist
- Carles Planas (born 1991), Spanish association football player
- Carmen Planas (1914–1964), Filipino politician
- Eusebi Planas (1833–1897), Spanish artist
- Evelio Planas (born 1930), Cuban sprinter
- Francesc d'A. Planas Doria (1879–1955), Spanish painter
- Francisco Planas (1908–1990), Cuban chess player
- Israel Hernández Planas (born 1970), Cuban judoka
- José Planas, several people
- Juan-Carlos Planas (born 1970), American politician
- Juan Batlle Planas (1911–1966), Argentine painter
- Luis Planas (born 1952), Spanish labour inspector, diplomat, and politician
- Natividad Yarza Planas (1872–1960), first female mayor elected in Spain
- Raúl Planas (1920–2001), Cuban singer and songwriter
- Rosa Planas Ferrer (born 1957), Spanish writer
- Sébastien Planas (born 1984), French rugby league player
- Yusmay Bicet Planas (born 1983), Cuban triple jumper
