= Ana Fernández =

Ana Fernández may refer to:

- Ana Fernández (actress, born 1963), Spanish actress, multiple Goya Award winner
- Ana Fernández (footballer) (born 2000), Spanish footballer
- Ana Fernández (volleyball) (born 1973), Cuban volleyball player
- Ana Fernández García (born 1989), Spanish actress
- Ana Fernández Militino, Spanish spatial statistician
- Ana María Fernández (1904–1993), Mexican singer
- Ana María Fernández Planas (1968–2021), Spanish linguist
- Ana Teresa Fernández (born 1980), Mexican performance artist and painter

== See also ==
- Ana Rocha Fernandes, Cape Verdian film director, screenwriter and editor
