= Planells =

Planells is a surname. Notable people with the surname include:

- Angel Planells (1901–1989), Spanish painter
- Bartomeu Planells (1949–2021), Spanish businessman and politician
- Hernando Planells (born 1976), American basketball coach

== See also ==
- Planell, another surname
