= Fito =

Fito may refer to:

== People ==
=== Football ===
- Adolfo Miranda (born 1989), Spanish footballer, mostly played for Spanish clubs
- Adolfo Ovalle (footballer, born 1970), Chilean footballer, mostly played for Chilean clubs
- Adolfo Ovalle (footballer, born 1997), Chilean footballer, has played for various clubs in various countries

=== Music ===
- Fito Blanko, Panamanian-Canadian tropical urban musician
- Fito Cabrales (born 1966), Spanish rock musician
- Fito Olivares (1947–2023), Mexican cumbia musician
- Fito Páez (born 1963), Argentine rock musician and filmmaker

=== Other fields ===
- Àngels Fitó (born 1970), Catalan academic and administrator
- José Adolfo Macías Villamar (a.k.a. Fito, born 1979), Ecuadorian drug lord

=== Fictional people ===
- Fito, a main character in Skimo, a Mexican TV sitcom
- Fito, one of the minor characters of the 1987 Mexican sitcom television series ¡Ah qué Kiko!

== Other meanings ==
- Fito, 10^{−24}, a suggested prefix for units of measurement; see Unit prefix § Unofficial prefixes
- Fundação Instituto Tecnológico de Osasco, a college in Osasco, São Paulo State, Brazil
- Mount Fito, mountain on Upolu, Samoa

== See also ==
- Fitto (disambiguation)
