= Planell =

Planell is a surname. Notable people with the surname include:

- Diamara Planell (born 1993), Puerto Rican track and field athlete
- Josep A. Planell i Estany (born 1951), Spanish academic

== See also ==
- Planells, another surname
