= Jaume Medina =

Spanish philologist (1949–2023)

Jaume Medina i Casanovas (Vic, Barcelona 6 April 1949 – Barcelona, 11 March 2023) was a Catalan philologist, latinist, writer, translator and poet.

== Life ==
=== Academic career ===
Medina went to the high school in his birthplace, and he got his degree in Classical Philology from the University of Barcelona (1972). In 1976, he wrote his doctoral dissertation about The classical Rhythms in Catalan poetry at the Autonomous University of Barcelona, where he got his doctoral degree, and where he has worked as a Latin Philology teacher since 1972 (professor since 2009).

=== Research ===
His researches have been basically philological, and have been dedicated to the Latin language and literature from all ages, with a special attention to vulgar, late, medieval and humanistic Latin, together with classical rhetoric, metre and stylistics, and also to Roman thought and civilization. He has taken part in several courses of introduction to Latin, and he has also managed several master courses. He has collaborated in many research projects, and he has become the director of a research project whose main aim is the edition of several of Ramon Llull]]'s Latin works. As a researcher, he has published more than three hundred works about Latin Philology (language and literature), classical tradition and Catalan Philology (language and literature). He has taught many courses, seminars and conferences about ancient and modern literature. He was the founder of the Catalan Society of Classical Studies (1979), and also coordinator of the Carles Riba Symposium (1984). He was a member of the editorial staff of the Fundació Bernat Metge. He has been one of the collaborators of the Riquer-Comas-Molas' Historia de la literatura catalana.

Medina made several translations into Catalan that were published in the collections of Textos Filosòfics (Philosophical Texts) Clàssics del Cristianisme (Classics of Christianism) and Fundació Bernat Metge. He was a collaborator of the Raimundus-Lullus-Institut from the University of Freiburg (Germany) in the task of edition of Ramon Llull's Latin works. He has also published in the Corpus Christianorum, Continuatio Mediaeualis collection, published in Turnhout (Belgium) by Brepols.

His articles and studies have appeared in several research and creation reviews, such as Presència, Els Marges, Faventia, Reduccions, Llengua & Literatura, Serra d'Or, Revista de Catalunya, L'Avenç, Clot, Faig, Quaderns de Pastoral, Ausa, Qüestions de Vida Cristiana, Cala Murta, Estudis Romànics, Ínsula, Revista de Filología Románica, Revista de lenguas y literaturas catalana, gallega y vasca, Analecta Sacra Tarraconensia, Quaderns de Versàlia, Llengua Nacional, Studia Lulliana, and the digital reviews Methodos, Mirandum, Convenit, Revista Internacional d'Humanitats, Notandum, Mirabilia.

Medina also collaborated in daily newspapers such as La Vanguardia, El País, Avui, Catalunya Cristiana, El 9 Nou and the digital newspaper Núvol.

=== Literary creation ===
Medina developed an important task in the field of literary creation. He was a member of the 1970 generation, and he took part in the foundation of the poetry collections Llibres del Mall and Ausiàs March (1973), where he published his first verse books. His poems dealt with a wide range of matters. He also wrote literary critiques and essays. Medina was the author of a theatre work and a novel. His translations of ancient and modern authors have had a wide circulation.

== Works ==
=== Poetry ===
- Temps de tempesta (1974). (in Catalan)
- Encalçar el vent (1976). (in Catalan)
- Dura llavor secreta (1990). (in Catalan)
- D’ara i de sempre (2000). (in Catalan)
- Cobles devotes (2010). (in Catalan)

=== Novel ===
- El Perdut i el seu mirall (2016). (in Catalan)

=== Literary critiques ===
- Lletres d'enguany i d'antany (2003). (in Catalan)

=== Essay ===
- Estudis de literatura catalana moderna i altres assaigs (2013). (in Catalan)

=== Research ===
==== Latin Philology ====
- Translations into Catalan of authors from all ages of Latinity: Catulus, Virgil, Horace, Ovid, Suetonius, Saint Augustine, Abbot Oliba, Anselm of Canterbury, Ramon Llull, Erasmus, Roberto Bellarmine, Francesc Calça, John Locke and Baruch Spinoza among others. (in Catalan)
- La poesia latina dels Països Catalans (Segles X-XX) (1996). (in Catalan)
- La poesia latina de Montserrat en els segles XVI-XVII (El Còdex Brenach de l’Arxiu Episcopal de Vic) (1998). (in Catalan)
- Raimundi Lulli Opera Latina. 97–100. In Cypro, Alleas in Cilicia deque transmarinis ueniente annis MCCCI-MCCCII compilata (2005). (in Latin)
- Raimundi Lulli Opera Latina 7–9, annis 1274–1276 composita (2009). (in Latin)
- Sobre Ramon Llull (2013). (in Catalan)

==== Classical tradition ====
- De l'Edat Mitjana al Dos mil. Estudis sobre la tradició clàssica a Catalunya. (2009). (in Catalan)

==== Catalan Philology ====
- Studies about Ramon Llull, Jaume Balmes, Jacint Verdaguer, Josep Torras i Bages, Àngel Guimerà, Josep Carner, Miquel Martí i Pol, Joan Triadú, Albert Manent and other authors of the 20th century. (in Catalan)
- Publisher of the collection of letters of Josep Torras i Bages and Josep Carner and collaborator in that of Carles Riba. (in Catalan)
- Carles Riba (1893–1959) (1989). (in Catalan)
- La plenitud poètica de Carles Riba. El període de les ‘Elegies de Bierville' (1994). (in Catalan)
- Les dames de Josep Carner (1998). (in Catalan)
- Carles Riba i Joan Maragall o la moral de la paraula (2011). (in Catalan)
- La lenta agonia del català, o l’ús de la llengua en els mitjans de comunicació (2013). (in Catalan)
- El parlar d’una familia vigatana (2014). (in Catalan)

==== Rhetoric ====
- Translation into Catalan of the Rhetorica ad Herennium (2000). (in Catalan)
- L'art de la paraula (2000), the first rhetoric and poetry treaty, appeared in Catalan. (in Catalan)
- Edition of Ramon Llull's Rhetorica nova. (in Latin)

== Awards ==
- Award for the best translation into Catalan (1982), by the Generalitat de Catalunya.
- Vth Award Fundació Congrés de Cultura Catalana (Foundation Congress of Catalan Culture) about Biography and Historical Research (1988).
- Serra d'Or Critics Prize (1990).
- Josep Carner Award, from the Institute for Catalan Studies (1997).
- Jaume Bofill i Ferro Literary Critics Prize (1999).
- Camilo José Cela Literary Critics Prize. From the Ciutat de Palma Awards (2010).
