= Najat El Hachmi =

Moroccan-Spanish writer (born 1979)

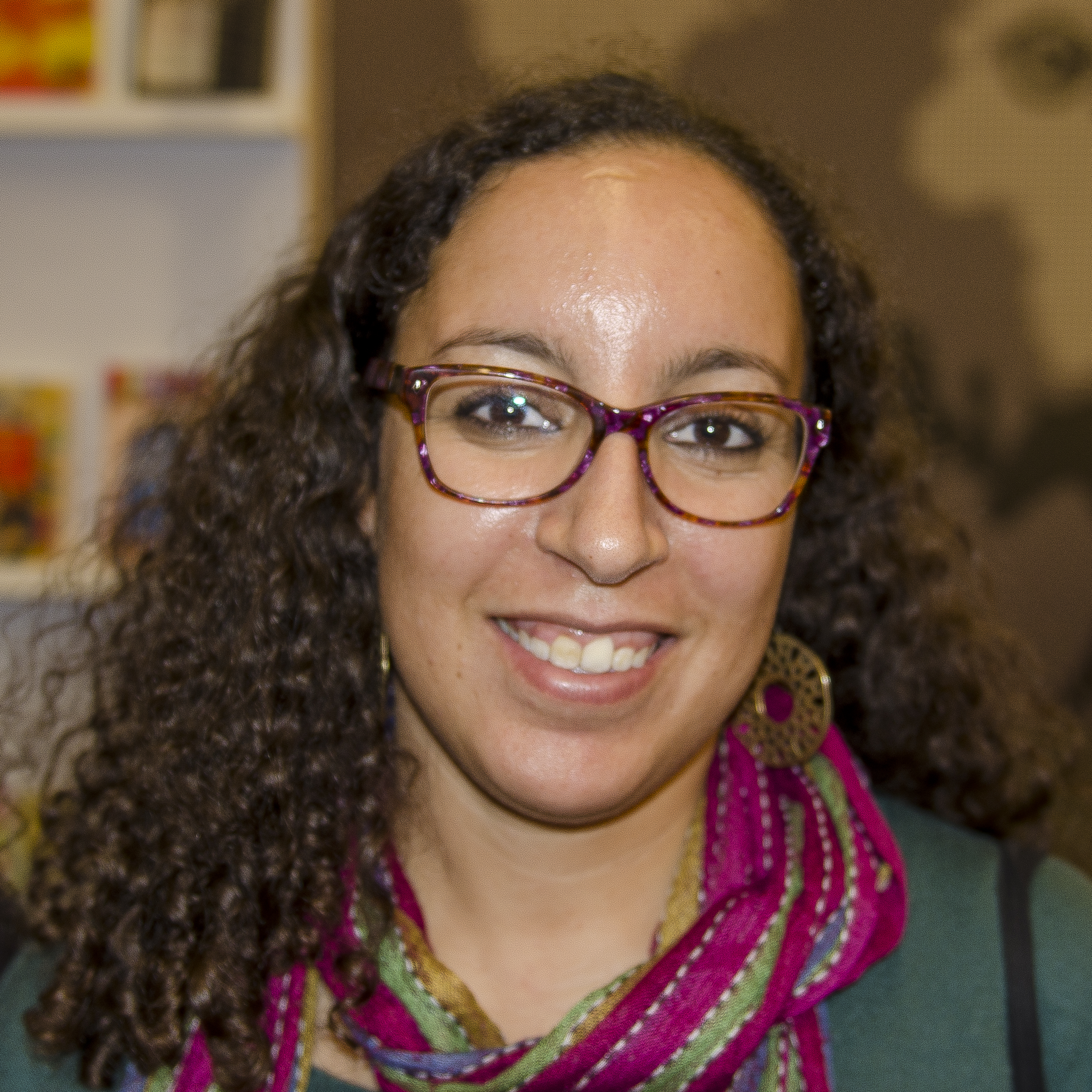
- Born: June 2, 1979 (age 47); Beni Sidel, Morocco
- Writing career
- Language: Spanish, Arabic, Berber, Catalan

Najat El Hachmi (Arabic: نجاة الهاشمي; born June 2, 1979) is a Moroccan-Spanish writer based in Catalonia. She holds a degree in Arabic Studies from the University of Barcelona. She is the author of a personal essay on her bicultural identity, and three previous novels, the first of which earned her the 2008 Ramon Llull Prize, the 2009 Prix Ulysse, and was a finalist for the 2009 Prix Méditerranée Étranger.

== Life ==
El Hachmi was born in Beni Sidel, province of Nador. At the age of 8 she immigrated with her family to Catalonia, Spain. El Hachmi studied Arab literature at the University of Barcelona and currently resides in Granollers. She acquired the Spanish nationality in 2006.

She began writing when she was twelve years old and has continued ever since, first as entertainment, and later as a means to express concerns or to reflect and re-create her own reality, in the (at least) two cultures to which she belongs.

== Career ==
Her first book, Jo també sóc catalana (I am also Catalan, 2004), was strictly autobiographical, dealing with the issue of identity, and the growth of her sense of belonging to her new country. In 2005, she participated in an event sponsored by the European Institute of the Mediterranean, along with other Catalan writers of foreign descent, including Matthew Tree, Salah Jamal, Laila Karrouch and Mohamed Chaib. During the Frankfurt Book Fair in October 2007, where Catalan culture was the featured guest of honour, she traveled to various German cities to participate in conferences in which she offered her perspective on contemporary Catalan literature. El Hachmi has made frequent appearances in the media, including Catalunya Radio, and the newspaper Vanguardia.

In 2008, she won one of the most prestigious award in Catalan letters, the Ramon Llull Award, for her novel L'últim patriarca (The Last Patriarch). The novel tells the story of a Moroccan who immigrates to Spain, a sometimes despotic patriarch who enters into conflict with his daughter, who breaks with the traditional values of the old country to adapt to the new, modern culture in which she finds herself.

== Works ==
- 2004 Jo també sóc catalana [I am also Catalan]. Columna Edicions. ISBN 84-664-0424-4.
- 2008 L'últim patriarca. Editorial Planeta. ISBN 978-84-9708-185-6.
  - English translation: 2010 The Last Patriarch. London: Serpent's tail. ISBN 978-1-84668-717-4.
- 2008 «L'home que nedava» [The man who swam], short story in El llibre de la Marató: Vuit relats contra les malalties mentals greus. Columna Edicions. ISBN 9788466409643.
- 2011 La caçadora de cossos. Editorial Planeta. ISBN 978-84-08-09877-5.
  - English translation: 2013 The Body Hunter. Serpent's Tail, 2013.
- 2015 La filla estrangera, Edicions 62. ISBN 978-84-297-7468-9.
- 2018 Mare de llet i mel. Edicions 62. ISBN 978-84-297-7644-7.
- 2021 El lunes nos querrán (the work won the 77th Nadal Prize under the fictional title Intrusas, signed by the pen name of "Cristina López")
- 2023 Mère de lait et de miel édition Verdier. ISBN 2378561598.

== Awards ==
- 2008 — Ramon Llull Award for The Last Patriarch
- 2021 — Nadal Prize for El lunes nos querrán
