= Muntaner =

Muntaner may refer to:

- Muntaner (surname)
- Muntaner (Barcelona–Vallès Line)
- Chronicle of Muntaner
