= Muntaner (surname) =

Muntaner is a Catalan surname. Notable people with the surname include:

- Antoni Roig Muntaner (1931–2019), Spanish politician
- David Muntaner (born 1983), Spanish track cyclist
- Ramon Muntaner (1265–1336), Catalan mercenary and writer
- Carles Muntaner (born 1957), Catalan public health researcher
