= Pilar Benejam Arguimbau =

Spanish geographer and pedagogue

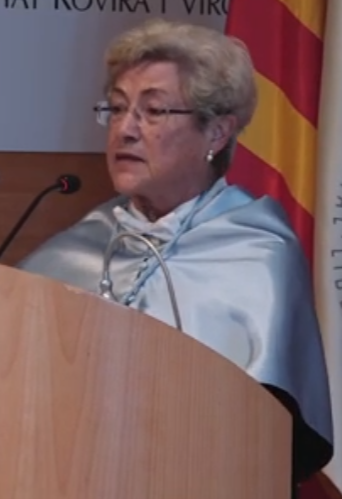
- At her Doctora Honoris Causa investment ceremony in 2020
- Born: Pilar Benejam i Arguimbau; 1937 (age 88–89); Ciutadella de Menorca, Spain
- Occupations: Geographer, university professor, pedagogue, writer
- Awards: Ramon Llull Award (2003); Creu de Sant Jordi (2004)

Academic background
- Education: Doctor
- Alma mater: Autonomous University of Barcelona

Academic work
- Institutions: Autonomous University of Barcelona

Pilar Benejam i Arguimbau (born 1937) is a Spanish geographer and pedagogue. In 1961 she graduated in teaching from the School of the Balearic Islands. In 1966 she obtained a licentiate in pedagogy, and another in history from the University of Barcelona in 1972. Finally, in 1985, she received a doctorate in pedagogy from the Autonomous University of Barcelona (UAB).

== Biography ==
Pilar Benejam Arguimbau was born in 1937. She has a distant kinship with Professor Joan Benejam i Vives (1846–1922).

Since 1972, she has been a professor in the Department of Language Teaching, Literature, and Social Sciences at the UAB.

She has worked at the Costa y Llobera School, and at the Talitha School.

She has been part of several commissions for the reform of teacher training in Catalonia and the rest of Spain. She is an expert in issues of review of school programming in social sciences, and has advised public administrations in reference to the overall training cycle. Since 1994, she has been director of the UAB's Institute of Education Sciences.

She has been interested in all aspects of pedagogical renovation and didactic innovation, and in the introduction of the teaching of the different epistemological proposals of geography.

== Works ==
- Intercanvi. Geografia humana i econòmica del món actual (1976)
- La formación de maestros. Una propuesta alternativa (1986)
- Geografía e historia: educación secundaria, Editor Vicens-Vives, Editorial SA, 224 pages, ISBN 8431631597, 9788431631598 (1995)
- El proyecto curricular en el contexto del proyecto educativo institucional (1999)
- Una geografía humana renovada: lugares y regiones en un mundo global (2000)
- El mestre Joan Benejam i Vives, City Council of Ciudadela and Council of Education and Culture of the Government of the Balearic Islands, Mahón, Impresos Domingo, 31 pages (2001)
- Las ciencias sociales: concepciones y procedimientos (2002)
- Didáctica y construcción del conocimiento social en la escuela, Pensamiento Educativo 30: 61-74 (2002)
- Agora 3, Ediciones Vicens Vives, 344 pages, ISBN 8431623748, 9788431623746 (2010)
- Demos 3, Vol. 3: secondary education, Ediciones Vicens Vives, 344 pages, ISBN 843161465X, 9788431614652 (2010)
- Nou Cives 3, Ediciones Vicens Vives, 352 pages, ISBN 8468203017, 9788468203010 (2011)
- Nuevo Demos, 3 ESO (Madrid), with Albet i Mas, Montserrat Casas Vilalta, Pilar Comes Sole, Montserrat Oller Freixa, Ediciones Vicens Vives, 352 pages, ISBN 8468202061, 9788468202068 (2011)
- Nuevo Demos 3 Canarias Trimestralizado, with A. Albet i Mas, Montserrat Casas Vilalta, Pilar Comes Sole, Montserrat Oller Freixa, Ediciones Vicens Vives, 360 pages, ISBN 8468205281, 9788468205281
- Geography And History 1.1-1.2+cd's, with Margarita Garcia Sebastian, Abel Albet Mas, Cristina Gatell Arimont, Ediciones Vicens Vives, 288 pages, ISBN 8431698713, 9788431698713 (2011)
- Lurra Berria 1 Euskadi, Ediciones Vicens Vives, 296 pages, ISBN 8468201227, 9788468201221 (2011)
- "Excursions i activitats a Primària i Secundària", Perspectiva escolar 362: 72-75 ISSN 0210-2331 (2012)
- "Enric Lluch i Martín, la geografía, l'educació i el compromís cívic", Perspectiva escolar 367: 70-73 ISSN 0210-2331 (2013)

== Honors ==
- Member of the editorial team of the Journals of the University of Murcia
- Member of Rosa Sensat Teachers' Association, where she had a very active participation in the constituent stage of the Autonomous University of Barcelona and was editor of the Bellaterra Manifesto, for which she received that institution's Bronze Medal
- Sponsor of the Doctor Honoris Causa of the pedagogue Marta Mata (1926–2006)

=== Awards ===
- 2003: Ramon Llull Award
- 2004: Creu de Sant Jordi, awarded by the Generalitat de Catalunya
- 2004: Jaume Vicens Vives Award
- 2004: Emili Darder Prize, awarded for a life dedicated to teacher training
- 2011: Catalonia Education Award
- 2015: Gold Medal of Ciutadella
