= SlamBall =

Hybrid sport, variant of basketball

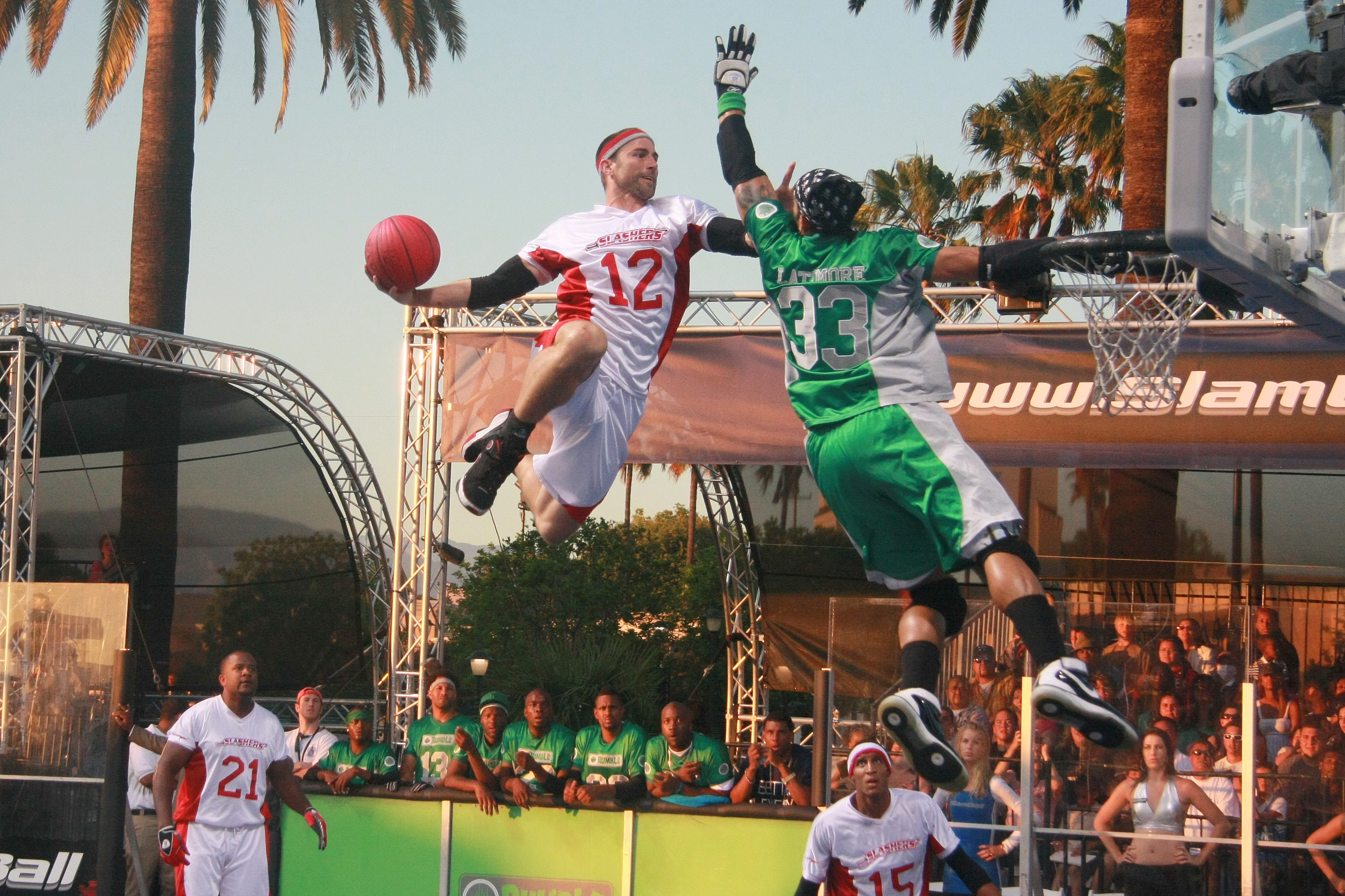
- SlamBall match showing a slam dunk

Characteristics
- Contact: Full
- Equipment: Basketball, trampolines

Professional SlamBall League
- Sport: SlamBall
- Founded: 2000
- First season: 2002, 2007, 2012, 2016, 2023
- Folded: 2003, 2008, 2012, 2016
- No. of teams: 8
- Countries: United States, China, Australia, Portugal, India
- Last champion: Mob
- Most titles: Mob (3)
- Broadcasters: (United States) ESPN, CBS, Versus, Cartoon Network; (Portugal) SIC K, SIC Radical; (Spain) Cuatro; (Italy) GXT, Italia 1; (Australia) One HD
- Website: www.slamballleague.com

SlamBall is a hybrid sport combining elements from basketball, American football, hockey, and gymnastics played with four trampolines in front of each net and boards around the court edge. While SlamBall is based on basketball, it is a contact sport, with blocks, collisions and rough physical play as part of the game, similar to elements of American football and ice hockey.

Professional SlamBall games currently air on television for ESPN and stream on ESPN+. Previously, they aired on television with Spike TV for two seasons in 2002–2003, and the POWERade SlamBall Challenge was aired on CSTV (now CBS Sports Network) in 2007. SlamBall returned in August 2008, airing on Versus (now NBC Sports Network) and CBS. The 2008 SlamBall season aired at one point on weekends on Cartoon Network. SlamBall was shown on One HD in Australia during 2009. SlamBall held its first major international tournament in China in 2012.

== History ==
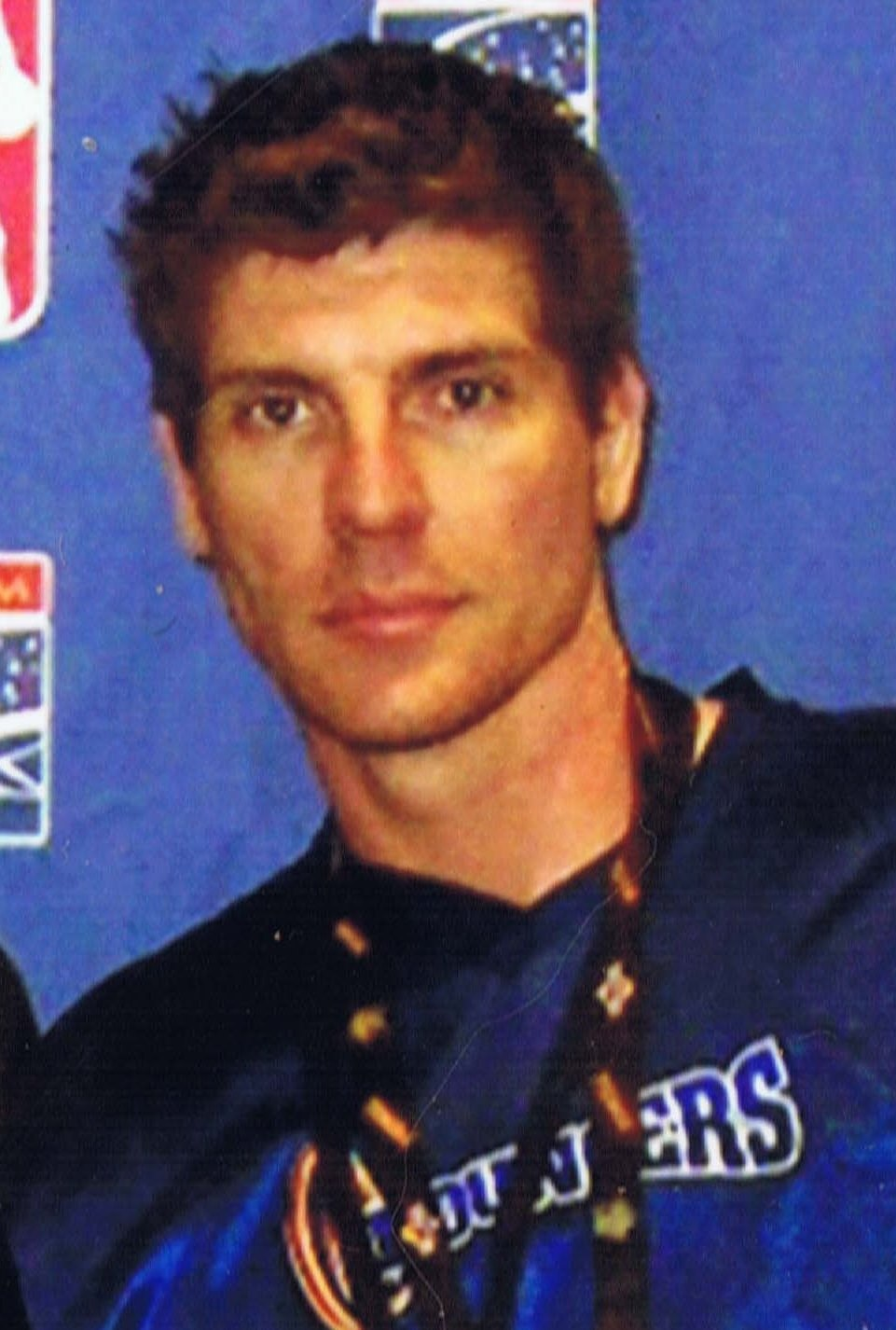
Mason Gordon, creator of the sport

Mike Tollin

SlamBall was invented in 1999 by Mason Gordon, who was working at the time for Tollin/Robbins Productions. The name SlamBall is owned by Gordon's company. Inspired by video games, Gordon sketched an idea on a napkin for a sport that combined several existing ones. He approached his boss, movie and television producer Mike Tollin, who liked the idea and thought Gordon was "onto something." Tollin helped finance the construction of a prototype court in an East Los Angeles warehouse six months later.

Gordon then tried to convince street basketball players to test his new idea; he wanted to find skilled, strong players who could compete comfortably while launching off trampolines and crashing into each other in mid-air.

Five recruits—James Willis, Sean Jackson, David Redmond, Michael Goldman, and Jeff Sheridan—trained with Gordon to produce the first games. These original six players were part of the first two teams, the Los Angeles Rumble and the Chicago Mob. These two teams played an exhibition series in 2001, which the Chicago Mob won. Soon, more players were brought in, including Stan Fletcher, Rob Wilson and Dion Mays.

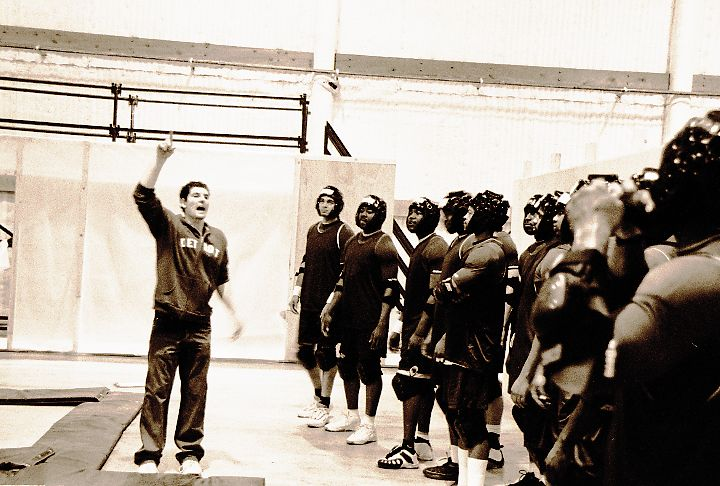
Gordon at the inaugural SlamBall combine in 2002

First played in Los Angeles, the game gained attention from street basketball players in the area. Within a year, 400 people had been enlisted as potential players. Open tryouts were held and the selection of players based on athletic ability, body control and court awareness started. Reducing numbers to about 60 players, the first ever SlamBall combine was held where players and coaches learned safety, the game and basic strategy.

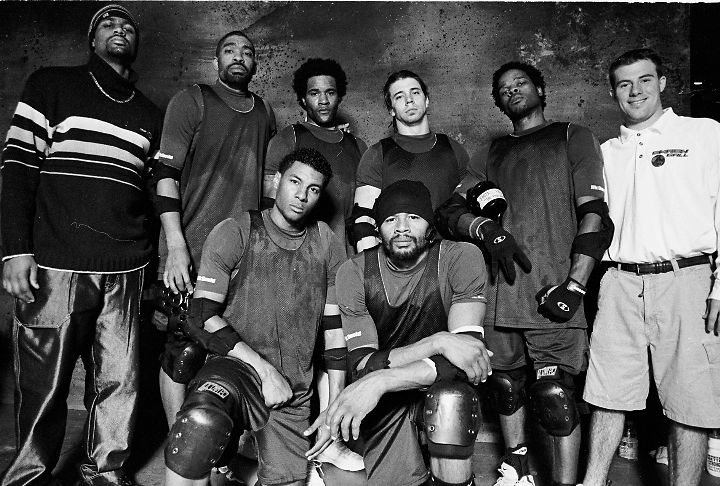
Early SlamBall Team Photo

In 2002, SlamBall made its television debut, on The National Network (later Spike TV and now the Paramount Network), soon after former Philadelphia 76ers owner Pat Croce had signed on as a partner. Six teams (the Bouncers, Diablos, Mob, Rumble, Slashers, and Steal) played in the inaugural season. Former NBA All-Star Reggie Theus served as studio co-host and color commentator.

After the second season in 2003, SlamBall creator Mason Gordon and co-producer Telepictures Productions had a disagreement. The league was dissolved. Five years later the league resurfaced for one more season. The league opened its doors to open try-outs.

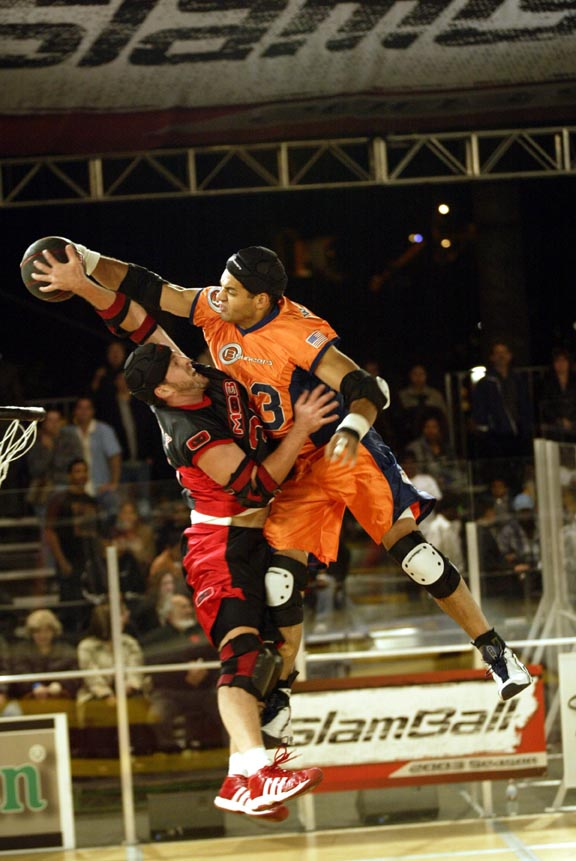
Confrontation between Rob Wilson and Kevin Cassidy.

The first SlamBall draft in 2002 saw Canadian Robert Wilson drafted as the first No. 1 pick ever in the sport. Before the second season of SlamBall debuted on the newly renamed Spike TV, two expansion teams (the Riders and Bandits) were added and a new court was built at Universal City, California.

Sam Jones and Whitney White going head to head at training camp

In 2007, the "POWERADE SlamBall Challenge" took place at Hoop City, a fan interactive event, at the 2007 Final Four in Atlanta, Georgia, and aired on CSTV in April 2007.

In Italy SlamBall made its debut on Italia 1 on 16 July 2007.

In 2008, SlamBall began planning for a new season, to be financed by IMG. The league accepted applications through its website for new players and coaches, and tryouts were held in three U.S. cities in April, 2008. A training camp for the 2008 season of SlamBall was held at IMG Academy in Bradenton, Florida from April to June 2008. Over 100 potential players participated in tryouts, eventually leaving 64 players after an 8-team draft. The league was cut to the 6 current teams. Some figures associated with the new season of SlamBall include: Commissioner Pat Croce and Coaches Kenny Anderson, John Starks, Raghib Ismail and Ken Carter. In summer 2008, SlamBall played its first season since 2003 at Universal CityWalk in Universal City, California. These games aired in a "Game of the Week" format on Versus beginning 31 August and led up to the finals on CBS on 2 November 2008.

In the 2008 season championship, the Slashers, led by Kevin Stapleton, defeated the Rumble. The coach of the Rumble was Ken Carter, of the famed Coach Carter. The season aired on Australia's One HD and Fuel TV.

=== SlamBall in China (2012–2016) ===
In 2012, SlamBall resurfaced in China, with the fourth series taking place in Hangzhou, and the formation of the Multinational SlamBall Athletic Association (MSAA) to scout and develop players from China.

After what appeared to be an extended courtship with the Chinese government, and community at large, new SlamBall facilities began construction in China. Eventually, the new partnership with Chinese entities created five teams to officially expand the league to Asia. SlamBall creator Mason Gordon played a significant role in advancing the process. In 2015 SlamBall started capturing the attention of the Chinese public. A fifth series was held in 2016 at venues in Beijing and Wuhan.

According to a report published by Vice Sports, Mason Gordon was quoted as saying, "We never left, we just needed to take the best path for us."

=== Current league (2023–present) ===
In August 2022, Mason Gordon announced that SlamBall would be returning in July 2023 as a live sports league. The league raised a $11M Series A funding round led by Roger Ehrenberg, with participation from David Blitzer, Michael Rubin, Gary Vaynerchuk, and Blake Griffin. The younger generation is their target audience.

The 2023 SlamBall Season would take place in Las Vegas for a six-week season followed by a seventh week for playoffs, with eight teams competing. On June 5, SlamBall Mini Camp officially started with the "Super 24", where 24 selected groups of multi-sport athletes trained for two weeks of training, leading up to the SlamBall Draft where the eight teams would draft 56 players. Florida A&M University alumnus Bryce Moragne was selected as the first overall pick.

On June 21, SlamBall and ESPN announced an exclusive two-year broadcast partnership to air over 30 hours of games on ESPN, ESPN2, and ESPN+, with the opening night of the 2023 season set for July 21. A new logo for the league was unveiled on June 22, and on June 27, the names and logos of the eight teams participating in the rebooted league were publicly revealed. The Mob, Rumble, and Slashers names were carried over from the previous seasons of SlamBall, accompanied by five new teams - the Gryphons, Ozone, Lava, Wrath, and Buzzsaw.

== Rules and regulations ==
Scoring is achieved by putting the ball into the net at the opponent's end of the court for points. Both teams simultaneously try to score points and prevent the opponent from scoring. The aim is to have outscored the opposing team when the game ends. A successful score can be worth two points if the ball is thrown through the hoop without the offensive player touching the hoop. Slam dunks are scored three points. All shots outside the three-point arc are worth three points as well. In the 2023 revival, there is a four-point arc measuring 26.5 feet (8.1 m) from the basket. It replaces the original three-point arc. Four players from each team (out of an eight to ten player roster) may be on the court at one time. Substitutions are unlimited and can be done during play (as in the game of hockey). Each team has a coach and additional staff, which includes assistant coaches, managers, statisticians, doctors, etc.

The game is controlled by two referees and the table officials. The table keeps track of the score, time, team possessions, fouls and the shot clock.

== Playing regulations ==
Games are played in four five-minute quarters, unlike the NBA, which plays for four 12-minute quarters. The game commences with "The Throwdown" - a "bounce-off" in which the ball is bounced at center court. The ball must reach its apex uninterrupted, at which point the players are allowed to "check" each other. Ten minutes are allowed for a half-time break; only one time-out is permitted to each team, which may only be used during the last two minutes of regulation play. A 20-second shot clock is utilized. Teams change ends for the second half. A tie score at the end of regulation time is settled by a series of "face offs" (see Fouls below).

== Positions ==
Each team has four players on the court at any one time. There are three positions:

- Handler: This is the primary ball handler on the team. It is his job to run the offense and organize the other members while controlling the flow of the game. Typically he would be responsible to set up the gunners to attack the basket while adding in his own offensive threat, comparable to a point guard in basketball.
- Gunner: The primary scorer on the team. A team's gunner will be the player on the team that will attack the basket and finish plays against the opposing teams' stopper, comparable to a forward or wing player in soccer or hockey.
- Stopper: This position is for the primary defensive player. He trails the offense only when necessary, and he protects the rim from attacking players by using himself as a shield. Goaltending is legal if the shot attempt is from inside the trampoline area.

Teams are free to choose their own configuration, the usual formations being either one stopper, two handlers, and one gunner or one stopper, one handler, and two gunners.

== Fouls ==
Each player can commit just three personal fouls before he is removed from the match (the match is 20 minutes; a FIBA-organized 40-minute game allows five, and a 48-minute game such as the NBA is six). A coach or player displaying poor sportsmanship (such as fighting, arguing vehemently against an official) may be charged with a technical foul. Two technical fouls results in a disqualification.

When a foul is called, the player who has committed it will then take position on the baseline of the lower trampolines while the player who was offended will take up offensive position at center court. This is called a face-off. Upon a signal from the referee the offensive player will be free to mount an attack at the basket, which the defender now must endeavor to stop. The defender must enter the lower trampoline only after bouncing in from the side trampoline. If the offensive player is successful, then points will be awarded depending on the shot converted and the offensive players' team will retain possession of the ball. In the case of any tie-ups, the defensive team always gain possession, but if the shot was blocked, the offensive team retains the ball from center court.

List of common fouls:

1. When an offensive player has the ball and a defensive player checks him in the back. Result: Faceoff
2. When an offensive player has the ball and a defensive player checks him before he has begun to dribble the ball. Result: Faceoff
3. When an offensive player has the ball and a defensive player checks him while he is attempting to enter the trampoline. Result: Faceoff
4. When two offensive players step/bounce on the same trampoline. Result: Turnover
5. When an offensive player bounces on a trampoline twice while in possession of the ball. Result: Turnover
6. When either a Player or the Coach of a team argues with the referee and uses physical or verbal abuse in anger. Result: Can either be a Faceoff or Turnover (referee decides)
7. When two players from the same team are on the same island or trampoline, or 'station' as it is called. Result: Turnover
8. Three-second violation: When any offensive player is stationed in an island area (sides of trampolines) for three seconds. Result: Turnover
9. When a shot is attempted from an island. Result: Turnover
10. When the defense holds position on an island, a charge can be called against the opposition. Result: Turnover.
11. Popcorn effect: When a defensive player deliberately interferes with the offensive player's bounce, caused by standing on the offensive player's landing spot to cause the equivalent of a trip in basketball. Result: Faceoff

== Equipment ==
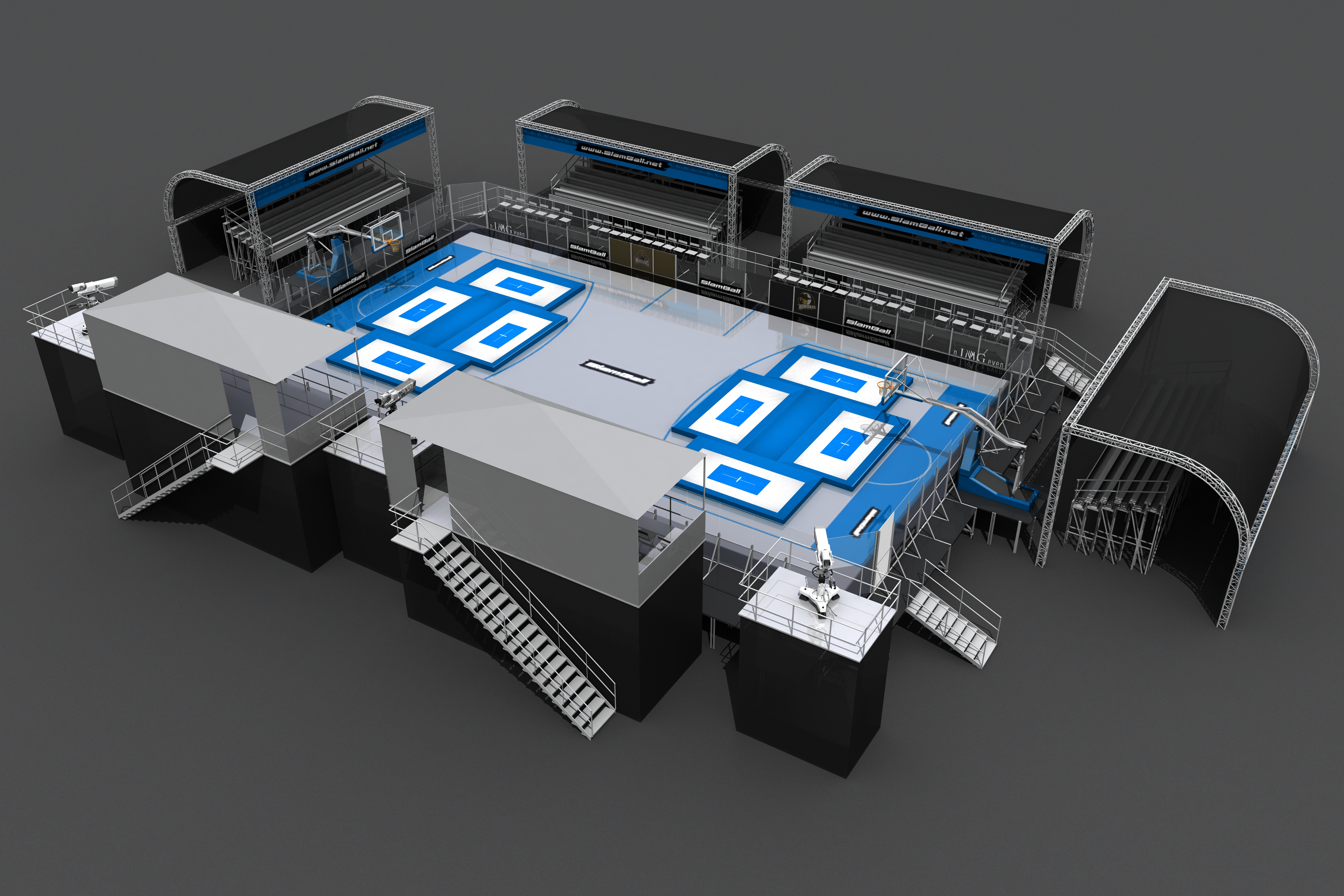
3D render of a SlamBall court.

The spring floor lies adjacent to two sets of four trampolines or spring bed 'quads' which dominate each end of the court. Each trampoline surface measures 7 by 14 ft (2.1 by 4.3 m). The shock absorbent panels pair with the competition bed trampolines to create a playing surface that both launches players into the air and cushions their landing upon returning to the floor. Specifically engineered pads are designed to cover the frame rails and their tapered design allows for safety for on-court play. This entire playing surface will be surrounded with an 8 ft (2.4 m) Plexiglass wall much like in a hockey rink. Players wear protective cups and special equipment to protect various areas of the body. This consists of knee and elbow pads, and an optional SlamBall-specific helmet.

In the 2023 revival, however, scrum cap-style helmets are mandatory for all players. Game can still continue if it is removed during play, but they cannot participate on defense in the trampoline area. Gloves are optional.

== Media exposure ==
On television, the sport has been seen on The Tonight Show with Jay Leno, One Tree Hill, CBS's King of Queens, Method & Red, ESPN's SportsCenter, The Best Damn Sports Show Period and Fuel TV. In print, SlamBall has been featured in The New York Times, Sports Illustrated, USA Today, Time and European editions of Maxim, GQ and FHM.

== Athletes and training ==
SlamBall hopefuls at tryout camp in 2002

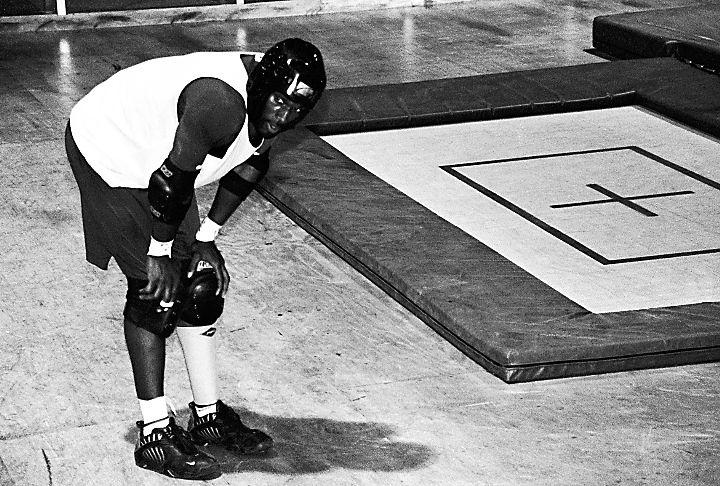
Anthony White vs. the trampolines early in training camp

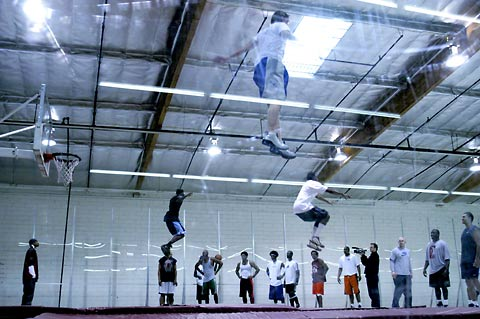
Aerial awareness and body control trampoline exercises

"Shakes" Fletcher in training camp 2002

Because of the nature of SlamBall, a broad scope is considered in the recruitment of the players. New players for the League have come from various areas. SlamBall has recruited players directly from college and pro basketball programs across the country, football players are used to the full-contact, up-tempo style of play, and many players of SlamBall found their origins on the gridiron.

== Teams ==
=== Active ===
Team Name	Team Name Founded	Championships	One Off Tournament Wins
Mob	2002	2012, 2016, 2023	2001, 2007
Rumble	2002	2002	
Slashers	2002	2008	
Buzzsaw	2023		
Ozone	2023		
Lava	2023		
Wrath	2023		
Gryphons	2023		

Inactive

Team Name	Team Name Founded	Last Active	Championships
Diablos	2002	2007	
Steal	2002	2003	
Bouncers	2002	2008	
Bandits	2003	2003	
Riders	2003	2003, (2008 Never Played)	2003
Rousties	2008	Never Played	
Hombres	2008	2008	
Maulers	2008	2016	

== Seasons ==
=== 2001 Original Season ===
2001	Playoffs		
Team	Won	Lost	Result
Chicago Mob	3	1	Champions
Los Angeles Rumble	1	3	Runner-Up

This series consisted of four games at a warehouse in Los Angeles, California.

=== 2002 Season ===
2002		Regular Season				Playoffs		
Team	Coach	Won	Lost	win-rate	Finish	Won	Lost	Result
Rumble	Ken Carter	7	2	.778	1st	2	0	Champions
Diablos	Mark Ellis	5	4	.556	2nd	1	1	Runner-Up
Bouncers	Hernando Planells	5	4	.556	3rd	0	1	Lost in semi-finals
Steal	Brian Taylor	4	5	.444	4th	0	1	Lost in semi-finals
Mob	Brendan Kirsch	4	5	.444	5th	–	–	Did not qualify
Slashers	Kevin Stapleton	2	7	.222	6th	–	–	Did not qualify

This season took place at a warehouse in Los Angeles, California.

The Bouncers stopper Rob Wilson was the 1st Pick of the 2002 SlamBall Draft.

=== 2003 Season ===
2003		Regular Season				Playoffs		
Team	Coach	Won	Lost	win-rate	Finish	Won	Lost	Result
Rumble	Ken Carter	9	1	.900	1st	0	1	Lost in semi-finals
Mob	Brendan Kirsch	7	3	.700	2nd	0	1	Lost in semi-finals
Riders	Xavier McDaniel	6	4	.600	3rd	2	0	Champions
Slashers	Kevin Stapleton	6	4	.600	4th	1	1	Runner-Up
Diablos	Joe Bryant	4	6	.400	5th	–	–	Did not qualify
Bouncers	Hernando Planells	4	6	.400	6th	–	–	Did not qualify
Steal	Brian Taylor	2	8	.200	7th	–	–	Did not qualify
Bandits	Mark Berekoff	2	8	.200	8th	–	–	Did not qualify

This season took place in Los Angeles, California.

=== 2007 Powerade SlamBall Challenge ===
2007	Playoffs		
Team	Won	Lost	Result
Mob	2	0	Champions
Bouncers	1	1	Runner-Up
Rumble	0	1	Lost in semi-finals
Diablos	0	1	Lost in semi-finals

This tournament took place in Hoops City in Atlanta, Georgia.

=== 2008 Season ===
2008		Regular Season				Playoffs		
Team	Coach	Won	Lost	win-rate	Finish	Won	Lost	Result
Rumble	Ken Carter	9	3	.750	1st	1	1	Runner-Up
Slashers	Kevin Stapleton	7	5	.583	2nd	2	0	Champions
Mob	Brendan Kirsch	7	5	.583	3rd	0	1	Lost in semi-finals
Hombres	Kenny Anderson	6	6	.500	4th	0	1	Lost in semi-finals
Maulers	John Starks	5	7	.417	5th	–	–	Did not qualify
Bouncers	Rocket Ismail	2	10	.167	6th	–	–	Did not qualify

This season took place at Universal CityWalk (within Universal Studios) in Los Angeles, California.

=== 2012 Season (MSAA SlamBall China Championship Series 4) ===
2012	Playoffs		
Team	Won	Lost	Result
Mob	2	0	Champions
Slashers	1	1	Runner-Up
Maulers	1	1	Lost in semi-finals
Rumble	0	2	Lost in semi-finals

This season took place in the Dragon Center in Hangzhou, China.

=== 2016 Season (MSAA SlamBall China Championship Series 5) ===
2016	Group Stage				Playoffs		
Team	Won	Lost	win-rate	Finish	Won	Lost	Result
Rumble	6	0	1.000	1st	1	1	Runner-Up
Mob	3	3	.500	2nd	2	0	Champions
Slashers	2	4	.333	3rd	0	1	Lost in semi-finals
Maulers	1	5	.167	4th	0	1	Lost in semi-finals

This season took place in the Wuhan Sports University Area in Wuhan, China, and in the China Renming University Arena in Beijing, China.

=== 2023 season ===
All games in this season are played at Cox Pavilion in Las Vegas, Nevada.

2023			Regular Season						
#	Team	Coach	GP	W	L	PCT	PF	PA	Qualification
1	Mob	Brendan Kirsch	16	16	0	1.000	985	533	Bye to semifinals
2	Buzzsaw	Hernando Planells Jr	15	9	6	.600	634	659	Bye to semifinals
3	Slashers	Stan Fletcher	13	7	6	.538	679	706	Quarterfinals
4	Wrath	James Willis	11	5	6	.455	561	601	Quarterfinals
5	Lava	Josh Carlton	10	4	6	.400	514	462	Quarterfinals
6	Gryphons	Jelani Janisse	12	4	8	.333	571	711	Quarterfinals
7	Ozone	Trevor Anderson	10	2	8	.200	486	585	
8	Rumble	Ken Carter	9	1	8	.111	428	601	

Standings current as of August 13, 2023.

==== Postseason ====
===== Bracket =====
Quarterfinals (August 15, 8 p.m.)
4	Wrath	40
5	Lava	64
3	Slashers	64
6	Gryphons	57

Semifinals (August 17, 8 p.m.)
1	Mob	49
5	Lava	36
2	Buzzsaw	57
3	Slashers	60

Final (August 17)
1	Mob	72
3	Slashers	44

All times are in Pacific Standard Time (PST).

==== Stats & awards ====
- On July 22, Wrath gunner Ty McGee set a new single-game scoring record with 43 points in a 65–55 victory over the Rumble.
- On August 5, Mob's Gage Smith recorded the first triple double (10 PTS, 13 LBR, 11 STPS).
- Gage Smith with the Mob was named Most Valuable Player and Defensive Player of the Year.
- Brendan Kirsch with the Mob was named Coach of the Year.
- Ty McGee with the Wrath was named Offensive Player of the Year.
- Bryan Bell Anderson of the Ozone won the SlamBall Slam and Jam Dunk Contest
- Cam Hollins of the MOB was named 5th Man of the Year

== Past champions ==
Year	Champion	Result	Runner-up
2001 Original Series*	Chicago Mob	3 Games – 1 Game	Los Angeles Rumble
2002 SlamBall Series 1	Rumble	46–41	Diablos
2003 SlamBall Series 2	Riders	66–60	Slashers
2007 Powerade SlamBall Challenge*	Mob	48–38	Bouncers
2008 SlamBall Series 3	Slashers	48–46	Rumble
2012 MSAA SlamBall China Championship Series 4	Mob	55–40	Slashers
2016 MSAA SlamBall China Championship Series 5	Mob	32–15	Rumble
2023 SlamBall Series 6	Mob	72–44	Slashers

*One-Off Tournament

== Popular culture ==
- In the 1989 movie Back to the Future Part II, "SlamBall" was mentioned as one of Douglas J. Needles' favorite sports during a scene that took place in 2015. This fact was listed in the databank captions shown on the videophone screen during a call between him and Marty McFly. SlamBall was also mentioned on the front page of a 2015 USA Today newspaper. The movie was released 13 years before SlamBall was ultimately founded in 2002.
- In The King of Queens episode "Knee Jerk," Doug Heffernan lies to his wife Carrie about having a knee injury but is ultimately caught when she finds him playing SlamBall with his friends.
- In the One Tree Hill episode "Choosing My Own Way of Life", Nathan is offered a position on a SlamBall team. The storyline ran five episodes and featured several of SlamBall's top players.
- SlamBall was covered on VH1's Best Week Ever.
