= José Planas =

José Planas is the name of:

- José Planas (footballer, born 1952) (born 1952), Spanish association football player
- José Planas (footballer, born 1901) (1901–1977), Spanish association football player and manager
