= Bellprat =

- Municipality
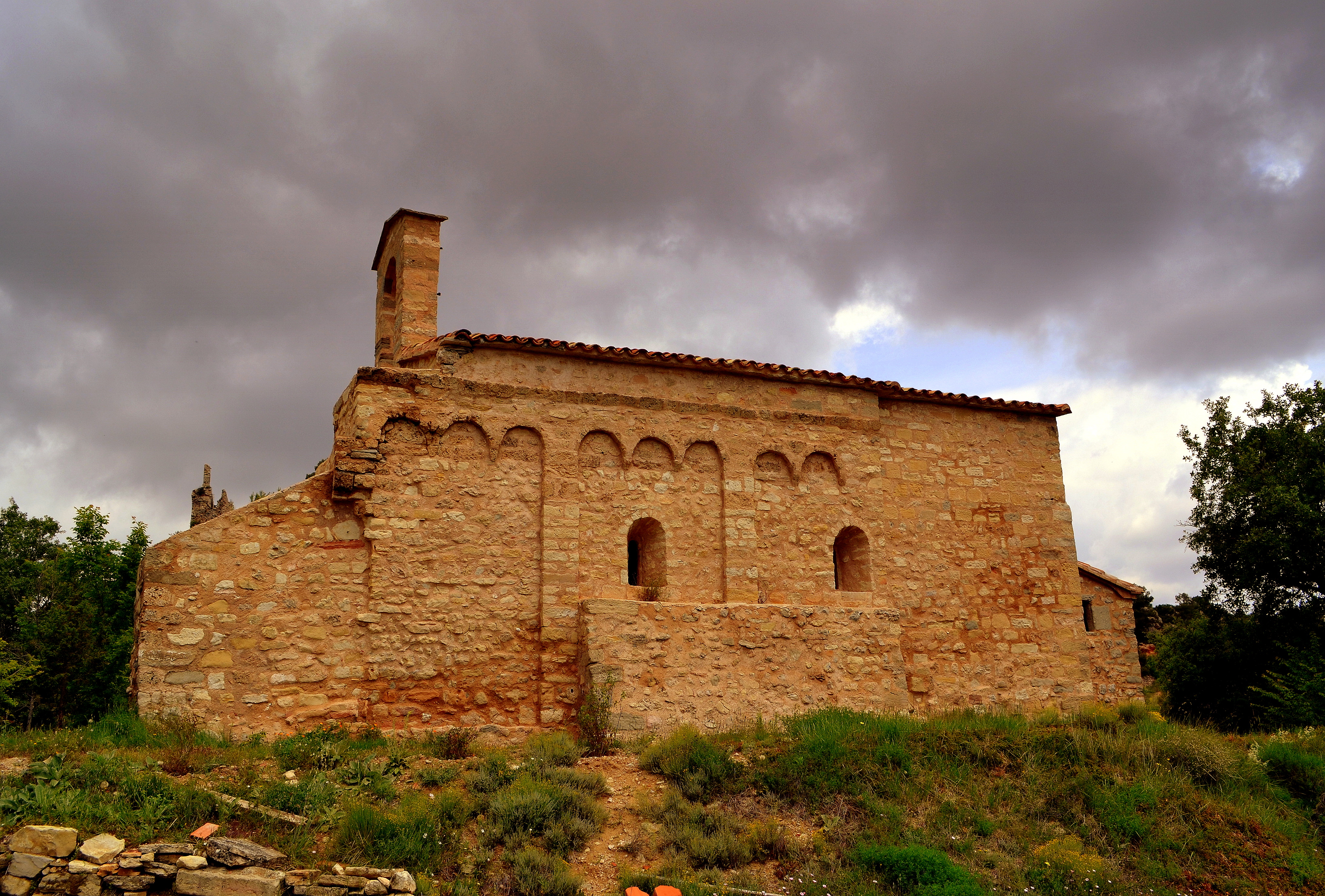
- St. Christopher's church, Castell de Queralt

- Coat of arms

- Location in Catalonia Bellprat (Spain)
- Coordinates: 41°31′8″N 1°26′7″E
- Country: Spain
- Community: Catalonia
- Province: Barcelona
- Comarca: Anoia

Government
  - Mayor: Martí Gual Vidal (2023)

Area
  - Total: 31.0 km^{2} (12.0 sq mi)
- Elevation: 653 m (2,142 ft)

Population (2025-01-01)
  - Total: 69
  - Density: 2.2/km^{2} (5.8/sq mi)
- Demonym(s): Bellpratenc, bellpratenca
- Website: www.bellprat.cat

Bellprat (Catalan pronunciation: [ˌbeʎˈpɾat]) is a municipality in the comarca of the Anoia in Catalonia, Spain. It has a population of 89 and an area of 30.98 km². The postal code is 43421.

It is a designated book town, due to the high number of bookshops in the vicinity.

== Notable people ==
- Natividad Yarza Planas, former mayor
