= Angela von Neumann =

American artist (1928 - 2010)

Angela von Neumann Ulbricht
- Born: 1928; Milwaukee, Wisconsin, U.S.
- Died: 2010 (aged 81–82); Palma de Mallorca, Spain
- Education: School of the Art Institute of Chicago

Angela von Neumann Ulbricht (1928–2010) was a German American artist from Wisconsin who lived much of her life in Majorca. She graduated from the Art Institute of Chicago, where she met her husband, but had strong ties to her native Milwaukee. Her German-born father Robert von Neumann, her brother Robert, and her husband John Ulbricht were also artists. She was a recipient of the Premis Ramon Llull in 1997.
