= Fitto =

Fitto may refer to:

- Fitto Movie Co, Ltd., a company bought up by Emperor Group, a Hong Kong conglomerate
- Raffaele Fitto (born 1969), Italian politician

== See also ==
- Fito (disambiguation)
