= Natividad Yarza Planas =

Spanish politician (1872-1960)

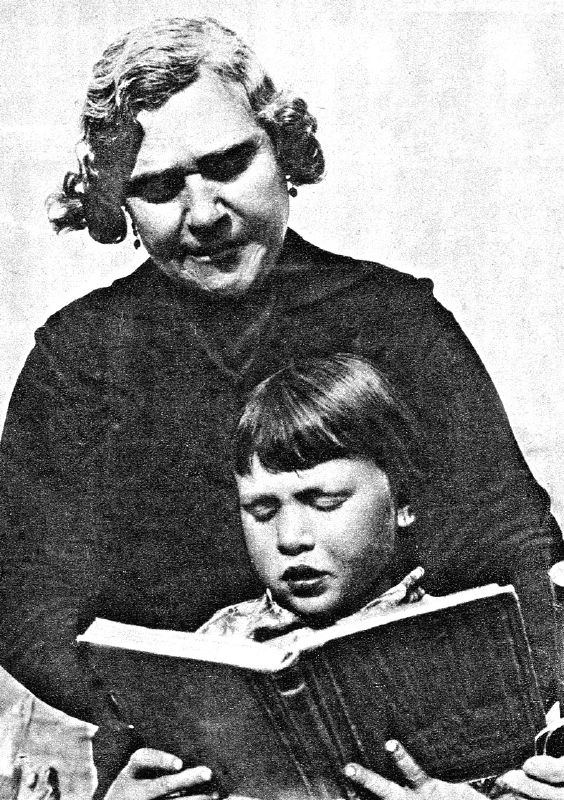
Natividad Yarza Planas

Natividad Yarza Planas (December 24, 1872 – February 16, 1960) was the first female mayor elected in Spain following universal suffrage.

== Youth ==
Born in Valladolid on December 24, 1872, Natividad Yarza Planas was the daughter of Manuel Yarza Lavilla, a shoemaker who worked for the army and was originally from Ebreya (Aragón), and Lorenza Planas Ramis, born in Uharte (Navarra). Natividad was the second of three siblings. The family moved to Zaragoza a few months after she was born, and in 1876 they moved to Barcelona.

From 1904 to 1905 she studied teaching in Huesca, and in 1906 she began to teach in Santa Margarida de Montbui, Pontons, Vilada, Malla, Saderra (Orís), Vilanova del Camí, Igualada, Gandesa, Cabrera de Mar, Candasnos and finally, in June 1930, she received a permanent posting as a teacher at the school in Bellprat.

In the summer of 1934 she moved to a teaching post in La Pobla de Claramunt, where she lived until the start of the Spanish Civil War.

== Political activity ==
In 1931, Yarza participated in the establishment, in Barcelona, of the "Associació Femenina Republicana Victoria Kent", together with Irene González Barrio, Julia Balagué Cases, Magdalena Alabart Belart, Josefa Ferrer i Vallès, Francesca Quelart i Ferrer, Teresa Sabadell and Isabel Jornet. This group published a manifesto in the Heraldo de Madrid (published on August 19, 1931) and El Liberal (August 21, 1931) where they expressed their intention to create a Committee in Madrid and other capitals. The objective of the association was to encourage women to collaborate with the republic by helping create a civic consciousness in a segment of the population which had not, until then, been interested in politics.

She joined the Partit Republicà Radical Socialista (Radical Socialist Republican Party) and was an outstanding propagandist and member of the Board of Directors of the Radical Socialist Center of the IX district of Barcelona. She combined teaching at Bellprat with trips to the party's headquarters at Avinguda Gaudí no. 9 in Barcelona, where she had the opportunity to collaborate with Marcel·lí Domingo. In 1933 she participated as a speaker in the tribute to Benito Pérez Galdós and at the sixtieth anniversary of the proclamation of the First Republic.

In the Spanish elections of November 1933, the first time women could vote in Spain, the right wing won a victory and her party split. Yarza then joined the Esquerra Republicana de Catalunya (ERC) party to head the candidacy in the municipal elections of Bellprat. She was elected mayor in the elections of January 14, 1934 by only five votes more than the Regionalist League. With this result, she become the first democratically elected female mayor in all of Spain. As a result, she was present at leading political events, such as the reception given by the President of the Generalitat, Lluís Companys, on February 12.

Some authors suggest that it was Catalina San Martín who was the first female elected mayor, as in Spain they could vote a few months before Catalonia. If so, Yarza would be the first female Catalan mayor to be elected.

After the events of October 1934, her political activity practically stopped and she returned to her teaching post, being replaced as mayor by Josep Solé i Solé by order of the military authority.

During the civil war, despite being 63 years old, she enlisted in the Barrio column that left Barcelona on August 24. She moved to the Aragon front, in the area of Tardienta and the surroundings of Huesca where she carried out supply tasks for the trenches. Her involvement at the front ended when the militia columns were militarized and integrated into the People's Army of the Republic. Yarza moved to Barcelona to join the Council of the Escola Nova Unificada as a teacher after helping her substitute in La Pobla de Claramunt, Núria Maestre. Natividad Yarza was assigned to a school in the upper part of Carrer Balmes in Barcelona where she also resided until the end of the war.

Once the fascist occupation of Catalonia was completed, Yarza went into exile in France where she survived as an iron presser and thanks to a grant from Spanish Refugee Aid. On October 21, 1940, the Comisión Depuradora de Magisterio dismissed her as a teacher.

Planas died in Toulouse on February 16, 1960 at the age of 87, after a fall.

== Bibliography ==
- Dalmau Ribalta, Antoni «Els darrers dies de Natividad Yarza, la primera alcaldessa (1872-1960)». Revista d'Igualada, 43, abril 2013.
- Dalmau Ribalta, Antoni; Surroca Ribalta, Isidre Natividad Yarza, mestra, alcaldessa, miliciana. Fundació Josep Irla [Barcelona], 2022.
- Surroca, Isidre «Natividad Yarza, la primera alcaldessa de Catalunya». Revista d'Igualada, 31, abril 2009.
