= Open University of Catalonia =

Educational organization

- Universitat Oberta de Catalunya
- Established: 6 October 1994
- Affiliations: Xarxa Vives d'Universitats; Associació Catalana d'Universitats Públiques (ACUP); European University Association
- Budget: 161 M€ (2023)
- Rector: Àngels Fitó
- Academic staff: 7,196 (2022)
- Administrative staff: 870
- Students: 104,501
- Location: Barcelona, Catalonia, Spain
- Campus: Virtual
- Website: www.uoc.edu

The Open University of Catalonia (Catalan: Universitat Oberta de Catalunya, UOC; IPA: [uniβəɾsiˈtat uˈβɛɾtə ðə kətəˈluɲə]) is a private open university based in Barcelona, Spain.

The UOC offers graduate and postgraduate programs in Catalan, Spanish and English in fields such as Psychology, Computer Science, Education sciences, Information and Knowledge Society, and Economics. Also, an Information and Knowledge Society Doctoral Program is available that explores research fields such as e-law, e-learning, network society, education, and online communities. It has support centers in a number of cities in Spain, Andorra, Mexico and Colombia.

== History ==
The UOC was created in 1994 as a result of the Parliament of Catalonia urging the Government of the Generalitat of Catalonia to take the relevant measures to consolidate a distance learning system. It was constituted through a public deed on October 6, 1994, adopting the legal form of a foundation, the Fundació per la Universitat Oberta de Catalunya. At the same time, the UOC was recognized by the Law of the Parliament of Catalonia 3/1995, of April 6, recognizing it as a member of the Catalan universities system.

It was set up with the mission of offering lifelong learning, of encouraging all those who wish to improve their abilities and skills to access the university, and in this way to grow the educational level and skills of society in general.

== Organization and administration ==
UOC is governed by a Foundation (Fundació per a la Universitat Oberta de Catalunya, FUOC). The administration, management and representation of the FUOC correspond to the following governing bodies: a Board of Trustees, a permanent commission, which acts as a permanent body in the administration and management of the Foundation; and the Advisory Council, which assists the Board of Trustees as a consultative or advisory body for the Foundation.

As of 2023, there are 656 faculty and research staff, 208 of whom are full time researchers.

=== Presidents ===
President	Term
Gabriel Ferraté Pascual	1995–2005
Imma Tubella Casadevall	2005–2013
Josep A. Planell i Estany	2013–2023
Àngels Fitó	2023–today

== Academics ==
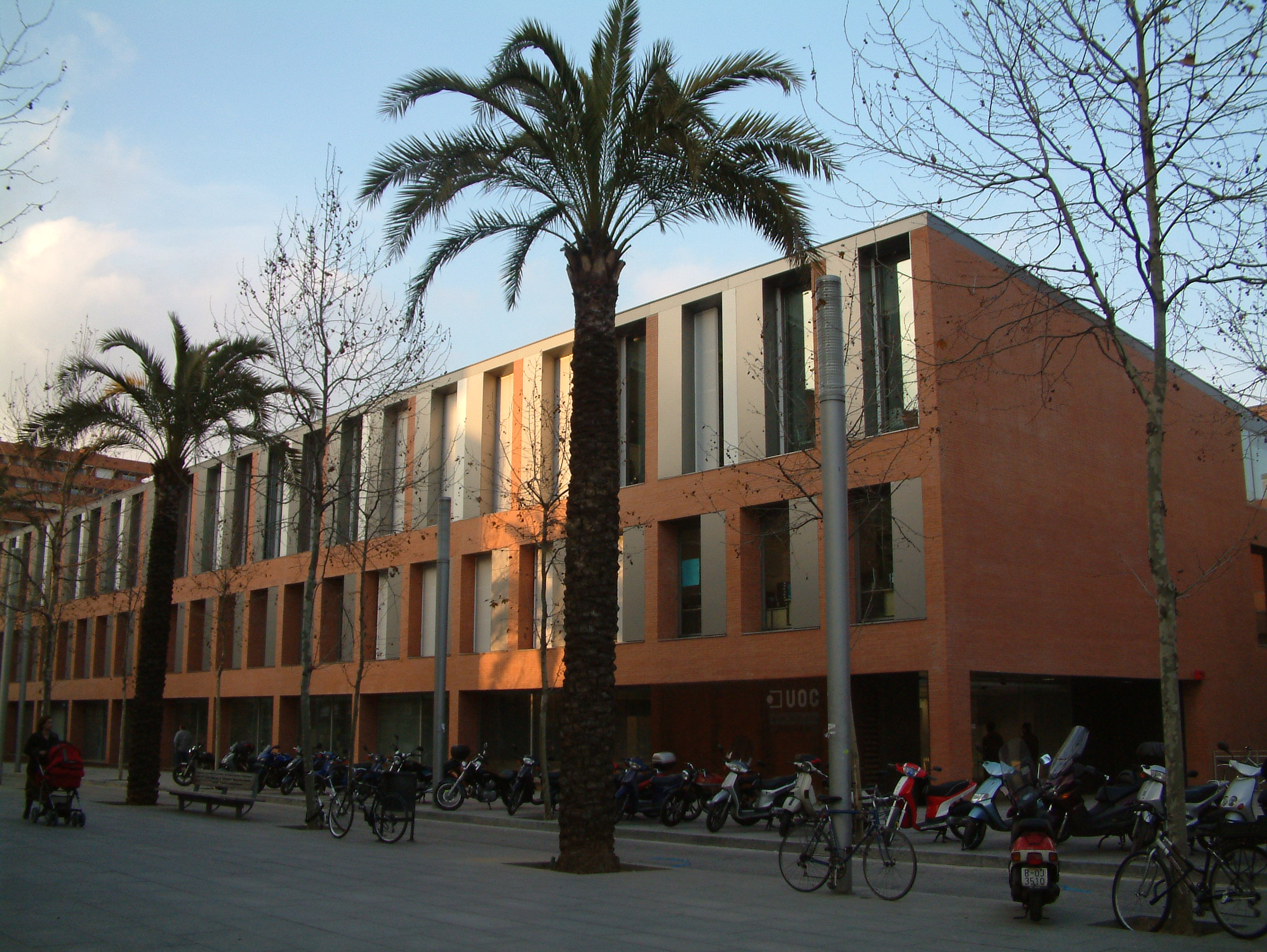
22@ institutional office, in Barcelona (Rambla del Poblenou).

=== Teaching and learning ===
As of 2023, the Universitat Oberta de Catalunya offers 28 bachelor's programs, 53 master's programs and eight doctoral degrees. Until the 2021–2022 academic year, UOC had granted 104,501 graduate degrees to students from 138 countries.

The UOC's course offering is divided into the following faculties:

- Faculty of Arts and Humanities
- Faculty of Economics and Business
- Faculty of Health Sciences
- Faculty of Information and Communication Sciences
- Faculty of Computer Science, Multimedia and Telecommunications
- Faculty of Law and Political Science
- Faculty of Psychology and Education Sciences

=== Research ===
The UOC focuses its research activity on the interaction between technology and the human and social sciences. It has two research centers—the Internet Interdisciplinary Institute (IN3) and the eHealth Center (eHC)—, a research program in e-learning and seven studies with research sub-divisions. It also has a Doctoral School, with more than 350 predoctoral researchers.

In 2019 UOC signed the DORA Declaration. In 2023, a new interdisciplinary research and innovation space was inaugurated- located in the Can Jaumandreu complex.

=== Reputation and rankings ===
Among overall rankings, Times Higher Education ranks UOC as the Number 1 online university in ibero-america, in the Top 175 among the world's youngest universities and in the Top 10 of Spanish universities. The Shanghai Ranking of World Universities defines UOC among the 200 best universities in Communication and among the 500 best universities in Education. The university adheres to the standards set by the European Higher Education Area (EHEA).

== Publications ==
UOC promote the following publications:

- Artnodes. A journal about art, science and technology
- BiD. University text on library and information science (co-published with the University of Barcelona)
- Dictatorships & Democracies. Journal of History and Culture (co-published with the Fundacio Carles Pi i Sunyer)
- COMeIN. Journal of the Faculty of Information and Communication Sciences
- Digithum. A relational perspective of culture, individual and society in late modernity (co-published with the University of Antioquia - Colombia)
- ETHE. International Journal of Educational Technology in Higher Education (co-published with the University of Los Andes - Colombia)
- IDP. A journal about Internet, Law and Politics
- Mosaic. A journal about multimedia technologies and communication sponsored by the Faculty of Computer Science, Multimedia and Telecommunications
- Internet Policy Review. Journal of internet regulation (coedited with the Alexander Von Humboldt Institute for Internet and Society - HIIG)
- UOC R&I Working Papers
- Oikonomics. A journal about economics, business and society sponsored by the Faculty of Economics and Business

=== Institutional repository ===
The UOC makes O2, their institutional repository, available to provide open access to digital publications produced by the UOC community in the course of its research, teaching and management activities.

== Notable people ==
The Open University of Catalonia had total cumulative graduates of 85,700 as of academic year 2019-2020.

=== Honorary degree recipients ===
- Josep Laporte (2003)
- Tony Bates (2005)
- Jordi Pujol i Soley (2006)
- William J. Mitchell (2006)
- Alain Touraine (2007)
- Sir Timothy Berners-Lee (2008)
- Brenda M. Gourley (2011)
- Aina Moll (2012)
- Hanna Damásio (2012)
- Alejandro Jadad (2018)
- Manuel Borja-Villel (2018)
- Mary Beard (2019)
- Mariana Mazzucato (2022)
- Wendy Hall (2023)
