= Aina Moll Marquès =

Spanish scientist and politician (1930–2019)

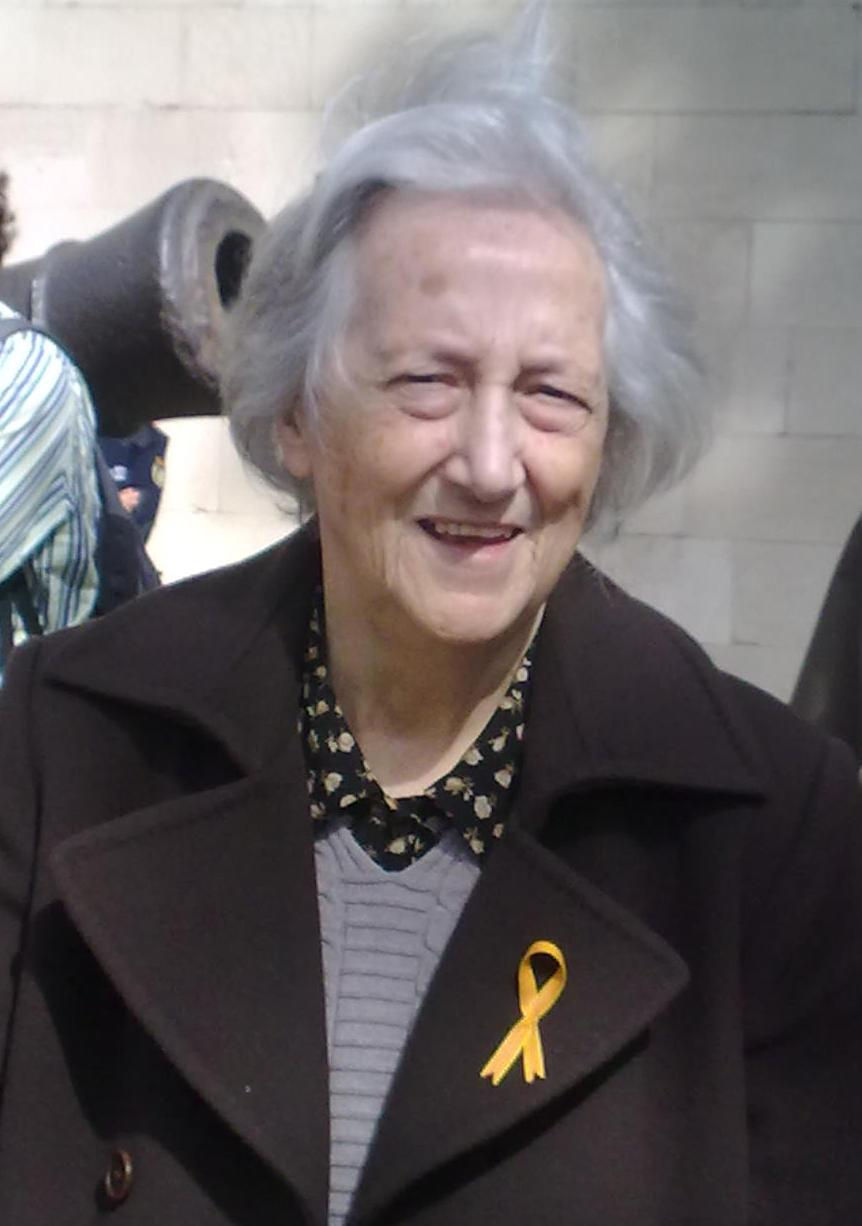
Aina Moll Marquès, 2013

Aina Moll Marquès (1 December 1930 – 9 February 2019) was a Spanish philologist and politician, who served as director of Linguistic Policy of the Generalitat de Catalunya. She was a recipient of Creu de Sant Jordi and the Ramon Llull Award.

== Biography ==
Aina Moll was born in Ciutadella de Menorca on 1 December 1930. She was the eldest daughter of Francesc de Borja Moll, with whom she collaborated in the last two volumes of the Diccionari català-valencià-balear. In 1953, she obtained a degree in Romanesque philology. Later, she continued her studies in Paris, Strasbourg, and Zürich. From 1954 to 1961, she was director of the Raixa Library. She was a member of the Grup Català de Sociolingüística (Catalan Sociolinguistic Group), and was also a member of the first Commission of State Transfers - General Interinsular Council of the Balearic Islands. She was general director of Linguistic Policy of the Generalitat de Catalunya from 1980 to 1988. Between 1995 and 1996, she was linguistic advisor to the Balearic government. Since 1993, she was a member of the Institute for Catalan Studies. Marquès died in Palma de Mallorca on 9 February 2019.

== Awards ==
- 1988, Creu de Sant Jordi of the Generalitat of Catalonia
- 1997, Ramon Llull Award of the Government of the Balearic Islands
- 2008, Premio Pompeu Fabra
- 2012, Doctora honoris causa at Open University of Catalonia
- 2015, Medalla de Oro del Consell de Mallorca

== Selected works ==
- Francesc de B. Moll: la fidelitat tossuda (2004)
- La nostra llengua (1990)
- a, bé, cé: sa pastera ja la sé : 2. Ilustró Aina Bonner. Editorial Moll, 48 pp. ISBN 8427302932, ISBN 9788427302938 (1980)
- Apprenez le Français avec nous: 1. Vol. 2. 2ª edición de Moll, ISBN 8427302002, ISBN 9788427302006 (1973)
