= Josep A. Planell i Estany =

Spanish academic (born 1951)

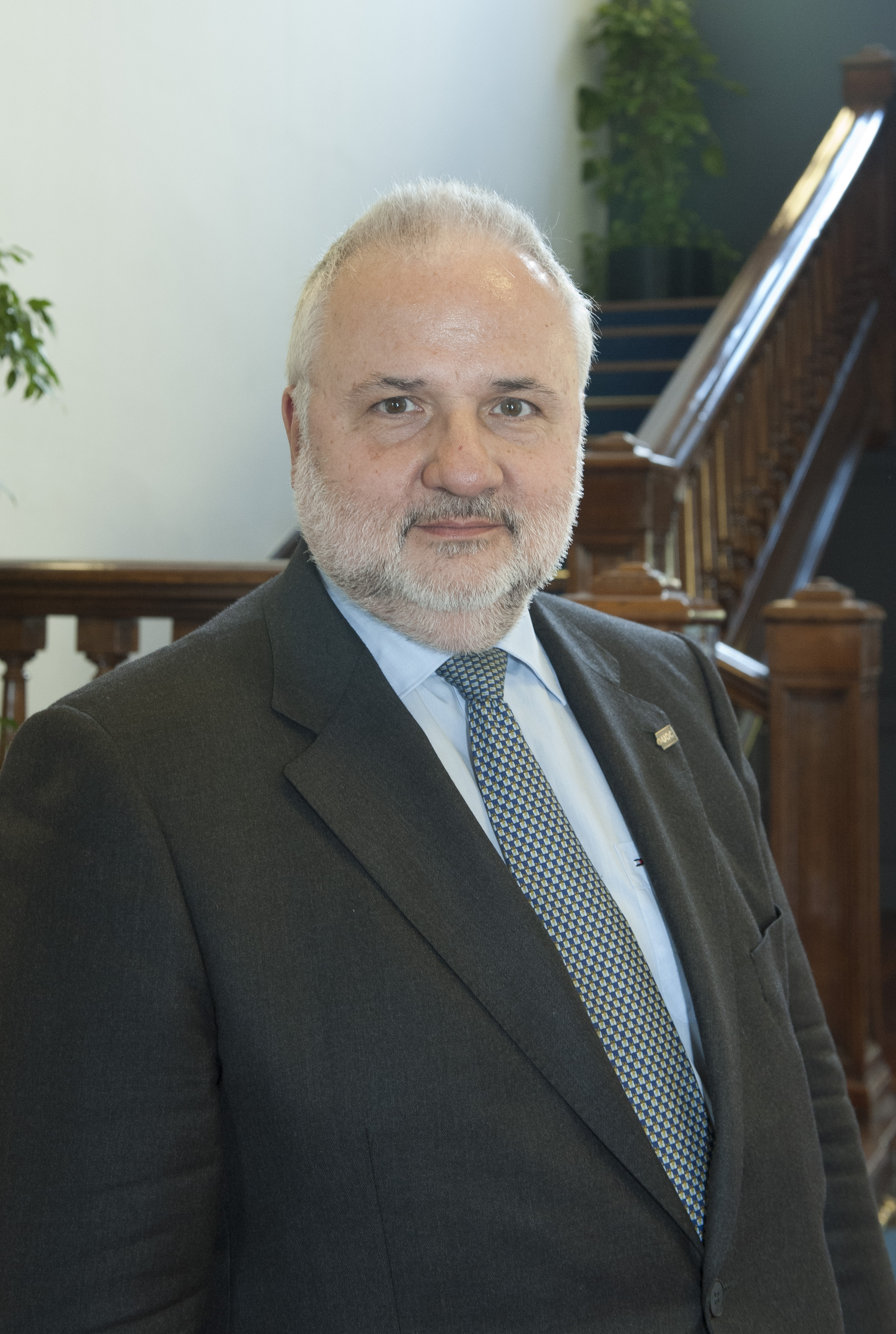
- Born: 1951 (age 73–74); Barcelona
- Occupation: President of the Universitat Oberta de Catalunya
- Predecessor: Imma Tubella i Casadevall
- Successor: Àngels Fitó
- Website: UOC President's page

Josep A. Planell i Estany (born 1951) is a Spanish academic.

Planell was born in Barcelona, graduated in Physics from the University of Barcelona in 1975 and earned his doctorate in Materials Science from Queen Mary, University of London, in 1983. Since 1992 he has been full professor in the Materials Science and Metallurgy department of the Barcelona School of Industrial Engineering at the Universitat Politècnica de Catalunya. He served as President of the Universitat Oberta de Catalunya between 2013 and 2023.

In 2013, he received the George D. Winter award from the European Society for Biomaterials. An international jury of experts selected Planell for this prestigious award. He was the first Spanish scientist to receive it and he did so “for his excellence in the research, vision and dissemination of the science of biomaterials, which is widely renowned in the scientific community”.

Likewise, in 2001 he was awarded the Catalan government's Distinction for the Promotion of University Research and in 2006 he received the City of Barcelona award, in the technological research category. He has been member of the Catalan Royal Academy of Doctors since 2006 and is an elected member of Barcelona's Royal Academy of Arts and Sciences.

Preceded by Imma Tubella i Casadevall	President of the Universitat Oberta de Catalunya; 2013 - 2023	Succeeded by Àngels Fitó
