= Bartomeu Planells =

Spanish furniture executive and politician (1949–2021)

Member of the Parliament of the Balearic Islands
- In office 3 July 1987 – 2 April 1991

Vice-President of the Ibiza and Formentera Insular Council
- In office 1987–1991

Personal details
- Born: Bartomeu Planells Planells; 1949 San Rafael, Francoist Spain
- Died: 26 March 2021 (aged 71–72) Ibiza, Spain
- Party: AP

Bartomeu Planells Planells (1949 – 26 March 2021) was a Spanish businessman and politician. He served as a Member of the Parliament of the Balearic Islands and was Vice-President of the Ibiza and Formentera Insular Council from 1987 to 1991.

Planells was born into a family of hoteliers. He worked in the wood and furniture industry, serving as President of the Federació de la Petita i Mitjana Empresa d'Eivissa i Formentera from 1981 to 1987.

Planells entered politics in 1976, when he joined the Liberal Party in 1976. He subsequently joined the Union of the Democratic Centre and the People's Alliance, as part of the People's Coalition. He was elected to the Parliament of the Balearic Islands in 1987, the same year when he became Vice-President of the Ibiza and Formentera Insular Council. He served both positions until 1991. While in the Parliament, he chaired the Economic and Finance Committee.

Planells also served as a member of the advisory council of RTVE on behalf of the Balearic Islands. On behalf of the Insular Council, he served on the board of trustees of the National University of Distance Education.

Bartomeu Planells died of cancer in Ibiza on 26 March 2021 at the age of 71.
