= Antoni Roig Muntaner =

Spanish politician and chemist (1931–2019)

- Born: November 14, 1931; Palma de Mallorca, Spain
- Died: June 4, 2019 (aged 87)
- Education: University of Valencia; Complutense University of Madrid
- Occupations: Politician, chemist
- Awards: Ramon Llull Award

Antoni Roig Muntaner (November 14, 1931 – June 4, 2019) was a Spanish chemist and politician who stood out for his research in macromolecules and for the creation of the University of the Balearic Islands (UIB).

== Biography ==
Antoni Roig graduated in high school at the Monti-sion College of Palma, graduated in Chemical Sciences from the University of Valencia in 1953, and received a doctorate from the Complutense University of Madrid in 1958. In that university he taught as To assistant teacher first, and then to assistant and permanent teacher. After completing his doctoral thesis, he went to the United States, where he resided for two years, first at Duke University (Durham) and later to the Massachusetts Institute of Technology in Boston. In 1963 he was a postdoctoral scholar at the Center for Recherches sur les Macromolécules in Strasbourg. In 1962, he joined the Rocasolano Institute of Physical Chemistry, assigned to the Higher Council for Scientific Research (CSIC), where he held the position of head of the Laboratory of High Polymers until 1971.

In 1971, he moved to the University of the Basque Country, where he was the director of the Department of Physical Chemistry for a year and where he obtained the chair of Physical Chemistry, until he moved to Palma to take charge of the recently created Faculty of Sciences, then dependent on the Autonomous University of Barcelona. From 1973, he became responsible for all the university centers in Palma, with the position of vice-rector in two universities, the Central University of Barcelona and the Autonomous University of Barcelona, institutions that Mallorcan centers depended on.

Between 1979 and 1981, he chaired the UIB's Management Committee until the UIB was finally created. Antoni Roig was appointed the Honorary Rector of the University of the Balearic Islands in 1981. During this stage, he was a member of the Scientific Committee of the Interministerial Advisory Commission for Scientific and Technical Research, created in 1979.

As of 1981, Antoni Roig went on to develop various positions in the Administration. Thus, in the years 1981 and 1982, he was the general director of Scientific Policy of the Ministry of Education and Science. He then went to the University of Alcalá of Henares, where he was Deputy Dean (1984) and Dean (1985 and 1986) at the Faculty of Sciences.

In 1987, the professional and personal career of Antoni Roig took to politics when taking over the Tinença de Batlle de Urbanisme of the City Council of Palma in the legislature from 1987 to 1991.

During four years, from 1995 to 1999, he directed the Department of Chemistry of the University of the Balearic Islands. In 1999, he was appointed General Director to create the General Secretary of the Research and Technological Development Plan (R&D) of the Ministry of Education, Culture and Sports of the Government of the Balearic Islands. Finally, in 2001, he was appointed emeritus professor of the UIB.

== Work ==
As a researcher, Antoni Roig has published more than fifty research projects, always in the field of Macromolecular Physical Chemistry. He has directed numerous doctoral theses and is the founder of an active macromolecular research group whose members are now distributed by the Complutense universities of Madrid, the Basque Country, Valencia, the UNED and Alcalá of Henares. He is the author, along with Mateo Díaz Peña, of two volumes of Physical Chemistry, edited by Alhambra-Longmans in 1972 with numerous reissues, a text for university teaching of wide use in both Spain and Latin America.
