= Ramon Llull Award =

Spanish literary award

- Named for Ramon Llull
- Awarded for: Excellence by persons or entities of the Balearic Islands
- Sponsored by: Government of the Balearic Islands
- Country: Spain
- First award: 1997
- Website: www.caib.es/sites/diaillesbalears/ca/presentacio-1138/

The Ramon Llull Award (Spanish: Premio Ramon Llull; Catalan: Premi Ramon Llull) is an honor awarded annually by the Government of the Balearic Islands to persons or entities of the Balearic Islands that have excelled in any field. It was established in 1997 by Decree 3/2014.

== Winners ==
=== 1997 ===
- Josep Alcover Llompart
- Margalida Alemany Enseñat
- Eladi Homs Zimmer
- Gabriel Llompart Moragues
- Aina Moll Marquès
- Juan Pons
- Baltasar Porcel
- Bartomeu Català Barceló
- Bartomeu Ensenyat i Estrany
- Enric Fajarnés Cardona
- Andreu Ferret Sobral (posthumous)
- Felicià Fuster Jaume
- Aligi Sassu
- Angela von Neumann
- Xesc Forteza

=== 1998 ===
- Jordi Nebot (posthumous)
- Maria Camps Rosselló
- José María Casasayas
- Manuel Elices Calafat
- Miquel Ferrà
- Llorenç Fluxà Figuerola (posthumous)
- Jaume Mir Mateo
- Jaume Mir Ramis
- Rafael Nadal Nadal
- Antoni Planells Tur
- Gabriel Rebassa Oliver (posthumous)
- Mariano Riera Torres
- Melcior Rosselló Simonet
- Guillermo Timoner
- Joan Torres Mayas
- Catalina Valls Aguiló
- Yannick Vu
- Blai Bonet

=== 1999 ===
Not given.

=== 2000 ===
- Maria del Mar Bonet
- Caixa Pollença
- Miquel Alenyà Fuster
- Cristóbal Serra
- Climent Garau Arbona
- Bartomeu Suau

=== 2001 ===
- Rafel Tur i Costa
- Maruja Alfaro i Brenchat
- Andrés Ripoll Muntaner
- Jocelyn Nigel Hillgarth
- Andreu Murillo Tudurí
- Llorenç Tous Massanet
- Fundació Deixalles
- Margarita Fullana
- Joan Llaneras
- Vicente Javier Torres Ramis

=== 2002 ===
- Joan Riudavets
- Confederació d'Associacions de Veïns de les Illes Balears
- Associació Paràlisi Cerebral de Balears (ASPACE)
- Josep Campaner Puigserver
- Encarnació Viñas Olivella
- Antoni Roig Muntaner
- Gabriel Galmés Truyols
- Carme Riera
- Anthony Bonner
- Bartomeu Bennàssar Vicenç
- Bartomeu Melià
- Pedro Quetglas Ferrer
- Coral Universitària
- Uc
- Antònia Buades Vallespir

=== 2003 ===
- Toni Catany
- Miquel Brunet
- Bernat Nadal Ginard
- Ferran Morell Brotard
- Guillem Mateu Mateu
- Vicenç Maria Rosselló i Verger
- Societat d'Història Natural de les Balears
- Pere Melis Pons
- Maria Antònia Oliver Cabrer
- Josep Marí Marí
- Isidor Marí Mayans
- Lluís Moya Bareche
- Sebastià Arrom i Coll
- Grups d'Esplai de Mallorca
- Cucorba
- Pere Serra Colomar
- Pilar Benejam Arguimbau
- Elena Gómez
- Guillem Vidal Andreu

=== 2004 ===
- Mostra Internacional Folklòrica de Sóller
- Vicente Rotger Buils
- Miquel Coll Carreras
- Bartomeu Barceló Quetgles
- Josep Miró Nicolau
- Gabriel Oliver Capó
- Francisca Serra Llabrés
- Pere Bonnín Aguiló
- Carme Font Jaume
- Román Piña Homs
- Aina Montaner Rotger
- Fundació Barceló
- Ja T'ho Diré
- Llorenç Vidal Vidal
- Pacífic Camps Coll
- Antònia Vicens
- Joan Prats Bonet
- Vicente Planas Hevia
- Ramon Rotger Moner
- Joan Juaneda Rover
- Joan Femenia Perelló
- Fundación Kovacs
- AMEBA S.A. (Agrupació Mèdica Balear)
- Julià Vilàs Ferrer
- Francesc Oleo Carrió

=== 2005 ===
- José María de Olivar y Despujol
- Centre d'emergències 112 de Madrid
- Catalina Bufí Juan
- Bernat Pomar
- Gabriel Seguí Mercadal
- Andrés Seguí Mercadal
- Associació d'Amics de l'Òpera de Maó
- Alexandre Ballester Moragues
- Aires de Muntanya
- Vicenç Matas Morro
- Llorenç Fluxà Rosselló
- Joan Miralles Lladó
- Juan Nadal Cañellas
- Jean Dausset
- Francisco Fornals Villalonga
- Felipe Moreno Rodríguez
- Rafaela Gomila Garcia
- Simón Andreu
- Ramon Serra Isern
- Rafel Torres Bosch
- Antoni Obrador Vidal
- Miguel Ángel Nadal
- Marc Ferragut Fluxà
- Maria Teresa Matas Miralles
- María José Hidalgo
- Àgueda Vadell Pons
- Menorca Bàsquet
- Luis Alejandre Sintes
- Josep Torres Riera
- Josep Jaume Pons
- Maria Barceló Crespí
- Antoni Cardona Sans
- Miquel Ferrer Flórez

=== 2006 ===
- Fèlix Grases Freixedas
- Miquel Codolà Camps
- Fundación Juan March
- Margarita Retuerto
- Concha García Campoy
- Margalida Llobera Llompart
- Erwin Bechtold
- José Orlandis
- Cristòfol Veny Melià
- Josep Miquel Vidal i Hernández
- Josep Colomar Juan
- José Cerdà Gimeno
- Miquel Bosch Flexas
- María Vázquez Pulgarín
- Rafel Socias Miralles
- Ernesto Ramon Fajarnés
- Rafel Marí Llacer
- Bartolomé Marí-Mayans Tur
- Mateu Cladera Matas
- Joan Llompart Coll
- Tomàs Montserrat Domingo
- Bartomeu Salleras Fuster
- Demetrio Jorge Peña Collado
- Mariano Ribas Ribas
- Joan Ferrer Torres
- Joan Guasch Marí
- Jaume Grimalt Obrador
- Antoni Prats Calbet
- Ca n'Anneta
- Maria Mayans Juan
- José Serra Costa
- Vicenç Mayans Escandell
- Antoni Cardona Torres

=== 2007 ===
- Caty Juan de Corral
- Damià Seguí Colom
- Vicenç Torres Esberranch
- Rosa Planas Ferrer
- Beatriz Anglada-Camarasa Huelin
- Franciscanas Hijas de la Misericordia
- Pere Canals Morro
- Lluís Rullan Colom
- Santiago Izaguirre Calvo
- Ferran Perelló Santandreu
- Maria Esteva Ferrer
- Elicio Ámez Martínez
- Ponç Pons
- José Castelló Guasch
- Francesc Obrador Moratinos
- Maria Magdalena Cladera Carriquiry
- Alejandro Onsalo Orfila
- Patricia Rosselló Palmer
- José Alfonso Ballesteros Fernández
- José Francisco Conrado de Villalonga
- Pau Vallbona Vadell
- Unió d'Associacions i Centres d'Assistència a Minusvàlids
- Josep Torrens Vallés
- Sebastià Crespí Rotger
- Joan Bauzà Bauzà
- Luis Fernández Pombo
- Ricky "Lash" Lazaar
- Can Molinas
- Lleonard Muntaner i Mariano
- Antoni Marí Calbet
- Antoni Mut Calafell

=== 2008 ===
- Antoni Obrador i Adrover
- Antoni Roig Sierra
- Concha Buika
- Cor de la Fundació Teatre Principal de Palma
- Elías Torres
- Ferran Pujalte i Vilanova
- Associació Fòrum per la Qualitat (FOQUA)
- Guillem López Casasnovas
- Guillem Rosselló Bordoy
- José Antonio Fortuny Pons
- Lluís M. Pomar i Pomar
- María de los Llanos Lozano
- Maria Salleras
- Maria Lluïsa Suau
- Maria Tur i Juan
- Mateu Castelló i Mas
- Miquel Àngel Riera
- Miquel Munar Ques
- Primary Palliative Care Staff at Joan March Hospital and the General Hospital
- Rudy Fernández
- Rosa Bueno

=== 2009 ===
- Antònia Font
- Jaume Adrover i Noguera
- Associacions Can Gazà-ICES
- Es Refugi, Zaqueo (ex aequo)
- Bartomeu Barceló Pons
- Manolo Bonet Fuster
- Oriol Bonnín
- José Costa Ferrer
- Carlos Cristos González (posthumous)
- Josep Darder Seguí (posthumous)
- Miquel Duran Pastor
- Els Valldemossa
- FEIAB
- Brotherhood of Retired Teachers of the Balearic Islands
- Cristòfol Guerau de Arellano i Tur
- IES Politècnic
- Joan Lacomba Garcia
- Miquela Lladó
- Úrsula Mascaró
- Maria Antònia Pascual, Joana Vanrell (ex aequo)
- Maria Misericòrdia Ramon Juanpere
- Margalida Ribas Prats
- Joana Maria Roman Piñana
- Lorenzo Serra Ferrer
- Joan Veny i Clar
- Pere Mascaró Pons (posthumous)
- Joan Riera Ferrari

=== 2010 ===
- Federació Empresarial Hotelera de Mallorca, Associació Hotelera de Menorca i Federació Empresarial Hotelera d'Eivissa i Formentera
- Bàrbara Mesquida Mora
- Joan Moll Marquès
- Juan Luis Sánchez
- Sor Enriqueta Garriga
- Elisabeth Salom
- Cercle d'Economia
- Miquel Àngel Llauger Llull (posthumous)
- La Sonrisa Médica
- 2008 Beijing Paralympics Team
- Col·legi Públic de Pràctiques
- Daniel Monzón
- Marta Monfort
- Antonio Lacy
- Miquel Àngel Roig-Francolí Costa
- Hilario Serra Mayans
- Federació d'Associacions de Dones de Mallorca
- Associació Voltor
- Lluís Ferrer Caubet
- Neus Torres Costa

=== 2011 ===
- Agustí Villaronga
- Eulàlia Serra Torres
- José Carlos Llop
- Isabel Maria Roser Hernández
- Josep Quetglas Riusech
- Úrsula Pueyo Marimón
- Joventuts Musicals de Palma
- Joventuts Musicals de Maó
- Joventuts Musicals de Ciutadella
- Joan Nicolau Garí
- Federació Balear d'Espeleologia
- José Luis Sureda
- Antoni Gili Ferrer (posthumous)
- Antoni Torrens i Gost
- Orfeó Maonès
- Isabel Cerdà i Soler (posthumous)
- Editorial Mediterrània Eivissa
- Associació de Veïns del Terreno
- Ressonadors
- Manuela de la Vega Llompart

=== 2012 ===
- Mariano Sacristán García (posthumous)
- Cossiers de Montuiri
- Valentí Puig
- Joan Guaita Esteva
- Víctor Guerrero Ayuso
- Servei d'Extinció d'Incendis i Salvament del Consell Insular d'Eivissa
- Federació de Colles de Ball i Cultura Popular d'Eivissa i Formentera
- Vicente Macián Cólera (posthumous)
- Sergio Llull
- Aires Formenterencs

=== 2013 ===
- Ferrocarril de Sóller
- Astronomical Observatory of Mallorca (OAM)
- Colegio Nuestra Señora de Montesión
- Vicent Guasch Tur (posthumous)
- Forn de sa Pelleteria
- Setmanari El Iris
- Club Náutico de Ciudadela
- Ferran Cano Darder
- Pedro Pizá Caffaro, Luis Martín Soledad

=== 2014 ===
- Teatre Principal de Maó
- Bartomeu Bestard Bonet
- Jaume Ensenyat Julià
- Moda Adlib
- Associació de Veïns del Pilar de Formentera
- Escolania de Blauets de Lluc
- Josep Planells i Bonet
- Pau Seguí Pons (posthumous)
- Associació d'Industrials de Mallorca

=== 2015 ===
- Josep Pinya Bonnin
- Pepe Ferrés Zendrera (posthumous)
- ISBA
- Societat de Garantia Recíproca
- Alonso Marí Calbet
- EAPN Illes Balears
- Xarxa per a la Inclusió Social
- Societat Casino 17 de Gener
- Plataforma de Afectados por el Deslinde de la Costa de Formentera
- Juntes de l'Associació Espanyola Contra el Càncer de Menorca (AECC)
- Associació Alba de Menorca
- Associació Eivissa i Formentera contra el Càncer (IFCC)
- Associació Espanyola Contra el Càncer
- Moviment Pitiús Pro Radioteràpia
- Unitat de Coordinació de Trasplantaments de l'Hospital Universitari de SonEspases
- Antoni Riera Moreno
- Jaume Mascaró i Pons (posthumous)

=== 2016 ===
- RCD Mallorca
- Grup Filharmònic de l'Ateneu de Maó
- Escola de Turisme d'Eivissa
- Fundación Rana
- Teatre de Manacor
- Rosa Maria Taberner Ferrer
- Joan Miralles Monserrat
- Escola Municipal de Mallorquí
- Elvira Badia Corbella
- Miquel Ametller Caules
- Bernat Pons Casals (posthumous)
- Jaume Ferrer Marí
- Francesc Marí Mayans

=== 2017 ===
- Associació Balear de Persones amb Discapacitat Física (ASPROM)
- Associació Insular d'Atenció a Persones amb Discapacitat de Menorca (ASINPROS)
- Unió de Pagesos de Mallorca
- Associació Memòria de Mallorca, Fòrum per la Memòria d'Eivissa i Formentera (jointly)
- Felip Cirer Costa
- Alicia M. Sintes Olives
- Illes per un Pacte
- Unitat de Seguretat del Pacient
- Federació de Cooperatives de les Illes Balears
- Isidor Torres Cardona
- Alba Torrens
- Marcus Walz

=== 2018 ===
- Santiago Colomar Ferrer
- Simon Orfila Riudavets
- Taula de Xarxes del Tercer Sector Social
- Club Náutico de Ibiza
- Lobby de Dones de Mallorca
- Agrupacions de Voluntaris de Protecció Civil
- Astilleros de Mallorca
- Teatre del Mar
- José Castro Aragón
- Merche Chapí Orrico
- Deborah Bridget Hellyer
- Manel Marí (posthumous)

=== 2019 ===
- Enric Majoral Castells
- Cor Ciutat d'Eivissa
- Handbol Club Puig d'en Valls
- Teatre infantil Sant Miquel
- Náutica Reynés
- Proactiva Open Arms and Proem-Aid Volunteers of the Balearic Islands
- Cooperativa Agrícola Sant Bartomeu de Sóller
- Joan Llobera Cànaves
- Catalina Cantarellas Camps
- Rossy de Palma
- Macarena de Castro
