= Ana María Fernández Planas =

Spanish linguist (1968–2021)

- Born: 16 October 1968; Blanes, Catalonia, Spain
- Died: 15 August 2021 (aged 52); Blanes, Catalonia, Spain
- Education: University of Barcelona
- Occupation(s): Philologist, phonetician
- Awards: Antoni Caparrós Award (2018)

Ana María Fernández Planas (16 October 1968 – 15 August 2021) was a Spanish philologist and phonetician from Catalonia.

== Biography ==
Ana Maria Fernández Planas was born in Blanes on 16 October 1968. After earning a doctorate in linguistics from the University of Barcelona (UB), she began her research in the field of articulatory phonetics in Spanish and Catalan. In 1984, she became coordinator of the journal Estudios de Fonética Experimental. She was a professor of linguistics at UB, and in 1998 she became the technical manager of its Phonetics Laboratory. In 2018, she received the Antoni Caparrós Award from the Bosch i Gimpera Foundation and UB for best knowledge transfer project.

She was one of the pioneers in the introduction of electropalatography in Spain. Among her most outstanding scientific contributions is the calculation of the values of the perceptual thresholds of duration and the fundamental frequency in Spanish.

She published more than 100 scientific works, including numerous articles on phonetics in specialized journals (such as Verba. Anuario Galego de Filoloxía, Estudis Romànics, Caplletra, Journal of the International Phonetic Association, Onomázein, Géolinguistique, Head and Neck, and Aphasiology) and some books on the same topic.

Ana María Fernández Planas died in Blanes on 15 August 2021.

== Selected works ==
- Prácticas de transcripción fonética en castellano (2001), with Josefina Carrera i Sabaté, Salvatella
- Así se habla. Nociones fundamentales de fonética general y española (2005), Horsori
- Manual de fonética española (2007), with Eugenio Martínez Celdrán, Ariel
