= Àngels Fitó =

Catalan academic

- Born: Àngels Fitó Bertran; 1970; Barcelona
- Occupation: University President
- Known for: President of Universitat Oberta de Catalunya (2023-)

Àngels Fitó Bertran (born in Barcelona in 1970) is a Catalan university professor and, since April 2023, President of the Universitat Oberta de Catalunya (UOC).

She got a PhD in Economic Sciences at the University of Barcelona and completed her studies with a master's degree in Business Fiscal and Financial Management at the same university. After some years working in university sector, she was appointed Director of the Economic and Business Studies of the Universitat Oberta de Catalunya (UOC), (2010-2019). Then, in 2019, she was nominated vice-rector of competitiveness and employability of the university.

In February 2023 she was appointed as the new President of the UOC, replacing Josep A. Planell (2013 – 2023).

She is also vice-dean of the Col·legi d'Economistes de Catalunya and vice-president of the Catalan Association of Accountants and Managers. She is part of Economy Advisory Council of the Government of Catalonia. She lives in La Garriga and is mother of three.
