= Catalina San Martín =

Spanish teacher and politician (1896-2000)

- Born: Catalina San Martín; July 28, 1896; Lerma, Spain
- Died: 2000 (approximately 103–104); Tres Cantos, Spain
- Occupation: Politician

Catalina San Martín (Lerma, July 28, 1896 – Tres Cantos, 2000) was a mayor of Rivas-Vaciamadrid (in Madrid, Spain) who held the position briefly during the time of The Second Spanish Republic. When she was appointed, she was a teacher at the municipal school. She can be considered the first mayor elected by universal suffrage in Spain.

== Career ==
After the proclamation of the Second Republic, a law was approved in December 1932 by which all the councillors were dismissed and a Management Commission of the City Council was created. Accidentally, the school teacher, Catalina San Martín López, was elected as president. The following year, in April 1933, municipal elections were held and she was elected mayor of the municipality. It is the only known case of a woman who, after having chaired one of these Management Committees, stood for election and was confirmed for the position by the polls. Her candidacy received a total of 204 votes, followed by three male candidates who received 201 votes each.

She is not known to have been a member of any party but various historians consider that it is very possible that she was close to the Partido Republicano Radical and the Unión Republicana Femenina, due to her friendship with Diego Martínez Barrio and her cordial relationship with Clara Campoamor.

During the Spanish Civil War, she was arrested by the Francoist police with her husband near Sedano. The fascists had orders to shoot her as soon as they stopped her and leave her in a ditch. Faced with the husband's refusal to allow his wife to get into the Francoist police car, they took a taxi and went to the corresponding offices in Burgos. There she was arrested and brought to justice. She spent a few days in a prison in the city, and finally a trial was held in which she was accused of joining the rebellion, one of the crimes included in the Military Code of the time.

== Final years ==
Finally, she was declared insane and disqualified from practicing her profession. In her husband's exact words, during the trial, she even stated that she did not recognize the legitimacy of the court derived from a coup d'état, and that she was indeed a Republican.

She spent the rest of her days in Madrid, with her husband and children. He died at the age of 101 years.

== Bibliography ==
- SÁNCHEZ MILLÁN, Agustín (2004). Rivas Vaciamadrid, mi pueblo. Rivas Vaciamadrid: Ayuntamiento. 84-930116-9-X.
