= Francesc d'A. Planas Doria =

Spanish painter

- Born: December 6, 1879; Sabadell (Catalonia - Spain)
- Died: December 29, 1955 (aged 76); Barcelona (Catalonia - Spain)
- Known for: Painting
- Movement: Post-Impressionism

Francesc d'Assis Planas Doria, (Sabadell, Dec 6, 1879 - Barcelona, Dec 29, 1955) was a Spanish Post-Impressionist painter.

== Artistic biography ==
Planas Doria's first teacher in Sabadell was Joan Vila Cinca. He would later study at the Real Academia de Bellas Artes de San Fernando in Madrid, and at the Reial Acadèmia Catalana de Belles Arts de Sant Jordi in Barcelona with the masters Josep Calbó and Antoni Caba. He completed his studies in Brussels.

During his early years, Planas Doria combined the family business with painting. In 1921 he exhibited the first time in the Serra Salon of Barcelona, and in 1926 he had his first personal exhibition in the Parés Salon in Barcelona. In 1931 he abandoned his mercantile business to dedicate himself to painting.

Planas Doria died in Barcelona in 1955.

== Family ==
The Planas Doria family had extensive properties in Les Corts, Barcelona (now the manor and terrains of the Barça Football Club), in Sant Martí de Provençals and Badalona.

Planas Doria married Assumpció Viloca Puig, the daughter of a textile industrialist from Sabadell. His descendants are two daughters and five grandchildren. His granddaughter, Glòria Rognoni, is an actress, playwright and stage director.

== Positions and distinctions ==
In 1921 Planas Doriawon two prizes at the competition “Barcelona seen by its artists.” In 1936 he was granted the Prize of Honor at the Autumn Salon in Madrid. In 1936 he was elected president of the Royal Artistic circle of Barcelona, and in 1942, vice-president of the Water-color Artists Association of Catalonia.

After the Spanish Civil War, Planas Doria participated as a painter in the board of restoration of the church of El Pi in Barcelona. In 1946, the City of Sabadell gave him the Silver Medal of the city.

== Work ==
Planas Doria described himself as an urban landscaper. Dedicating his entire work to figurative art, in 1926 he wrote: “I don’t believe myself authorized to judge the new art, but I must tell you in truth, clearly and definitely, that I do not like it, and if someday you see me painting it, think that I am no longer myself.”

In 2005 to commemorate the fiftieth anniversary of his Planas Doria's death, the critic Arnau Puig named his conference at the Royal Artistic Circle, “From Claudio Lorena and the theatrical landscape to the natural landscape of Planas Doria”. The teachers of Planas Doria at the Llotja were set designers. His paintings breathe this influence in their perspective and light.

The journalist Plàcid García-Planas in a lecture in 2006 refers to Planas Doria in the journal La Vanguàrdia as “the painter of factories.” According to him few Catalan artists – not to say none – have painted with such veracity fumes and steams and furnaces. And perhaps, which is even more interesting, in very few Catalan painters, art and industry are so well intermixed. .

Between 1912 and 1931 Planas Doria did several paintings on the town of Montcada i Reixac, including a painting of the Asland cement factory located there. Referring to this work Francesc Fontbona, of the Institute of Catalan Studies wrote, “Of a positively ugly theme he (Planas Doria) makes a brutally beautiful painting, which could be included in any anthology of the painting of his time.”

The critic Ricard Mas writes, “(—) with loyal followers in Barcelona, Bilbao and Madrid, where he exposes country and urban landscapes from all over Spain, mainly of Catalonia and the Basque Country.”

. In May 2013 the Planas Doria painting “Plaça de Sant Joan de Solsona” was auctioned at the Ankara Antikacilik salon in Ankara (Turkey).

== Planas Doria Archive ==
The Planas Doria Archive was created in 2005. I A reference number is given to each painting, and also titles, measurements, technique, data, and pictorial support, and a photograph of it is kept. The Archive contains more than 1,300 references. Tone.

== Planas Doria Association ==
The Association was formally constituted in 2010. Its mission is to preserve the memory of the artist and promote all kinds of initiatives that will permit a greater broadcasting of his work. The president of the Association is the painter's eldest grandson, Victor Obach.
