= Hernando Planells =

American basketball coach (born 1976)

Hernando L. Planells (born November 4, 1976) is an American basketball coach. He is a former associate head coach of Duke Blue Devils women's basketball, former assistant coach of the Maine Red Claws of the NBA Development League and former head coach of the Basketball Japan League (BJ) team Ryukyu Golden Kings. Planells has coached at the high school, college and professional ranks. He has also choreographed basketball action in movies and commercials. He was also the head coach of the Bouncers Slamball team.

== Early life and family ==
Planells was born in Los Angeles to mother, Carmen Waga-Pangan from Cagayan de Oro, Philippines, and father, Hernando Sr. from Spain. Hernando has children, both currently in college, named Preston and Gabrielle. Preston is a Division 1 athlete at the University of Utah and Gabrielle is a musical theater major at Chico State.

== Coaching career ==
Planells has a diverse background in basketball in both coaching and player development. Planells has also spoken at coaching clinics and conducts player development camps all over the United States and in countries such as Japan, Philippines, Australia, Switzerland and Taiwan. In 2011, he founded ELITE athlete training, which specialized in personal training and consulting services for athletes. Through his work with ELITE, he trained and assisted over 100 athletes reach their goal of gaining a college scholarship or playing professionally.

From 2005 to 2010, Planells served as a scout for Marty Blake, who is the Director of Scouting for the NBA. In his role as a scout, Planells put together scouting reports evaluating NBA prospects which were circulated to every NBA general manager and player personnel director.

In 2008, Planells returned to the United States after serving as head coach of the Ryukyu Golden Kings, an expansion team that is a part of the BJ League (Basketball Japan). For the 2006–07 season, he served as the head basketball coach for The Hollywood Fame, a team that participated in the American Basketball Association (ABA).

In 2005, Planells was named the first head coach of the Wyoming Golden Eagles out of the All-American Professional Basketball League. At that time, the 28-year-old was the youngest professional basketball coach in the country.

In 2020, Planells was named head coach of the women's basketball team for William Jessup University.

=== Slamball coaching record ===
| Team | Year | Regular season | | | | Postseason | | |
| Team | Year | Won | Lost | Win % | Finish | Won | Lost | Result |
|---|---|---|---|---|---|---|---|---|
| Bouncers | 2002 | 5 | 4 | .556 | 3rd | 0 | 1 | Lost in semi-finals |
| Bouncers | 2003 | 4 | 6 | .400 | 6th | – | – | Did not qualify |
| Total | | 9 | 10 | .474 | - | 0 | 1 | - |

=== Head coaching record in Japan ===
Legend
| Regular season | G | Games coached | W | Games won | L | Games lost | W–L % | Win–loss % |
| Playoffs | PG | Playoff games | PW | Playoff wins | PL | Playoff losses | PW–L % | Playoff win–loss % |

| Team | Year | G | W | L | W–L% | Finish | PG | PW | PL | PW–L% | Result |
|---|---|---|---|---|---|---|---|---|---|---|---|
| Ryukyu Golden Kings | 2007-08 | 44 | 10 | 34 | .227 | 5th in Western | - | - | - | – | - |

== Film credits ==
In 2006 Planells teamed up with Radiant Pictures and choreographed a Japanese basketball commercial featuring Japanese Basketball superstar Yuta Tabuse for Nissay Insurance.

- Planells has also choreographed the basketball scenes and trained the actors in "Coach Carter" starring Samuel L. Jackson.
- Choreographed the basketball scenes and trained the actors in "The Longest Yard" starring Adam Sandler.
- Choreographed the basketball scenes and trained the actors in "Rebound" starring Martin Lawrence.
- Choreographed the basketball scenes and trained the actors in "Spider-Man 3" starring Tobey Maguire.
- Choreographed the basketball scenes and trained the actors in "License to Wed" starring Robin Williams.
- Choreographed the basketball scenes and trained the actors in Semi-Pro starring Will Ferrell.
