= Ana María Fernández =

- Born: Ana María Fernández Pomar; 14 February 1904; Mexico City, Mexico
- Died: 1993 (aged 89)
- Genres: Bolero
- Occupation: Singer
- Instrument: Vocals
- Years active: 1929–1942
- Labels: RCA Víctor; Okeh
- Formerly of: Agustín Lara; Juan Arvizu; Toña la Negra; Pedro Vargas

Ana María Fernández Pomar (14 February 1904 – 1993) was a Mexican singer and the first female performer of Agustín Lara's boleros. One of the great stars of Mexican revues of the 1930s, she was also one of the first singers to perform on Mexico City's famous XEW radio station, where announcer Pedro de Lille introduced her as "La Cancionera del Estilo Único" (The Songstress of the Unique Style). She recorded several singles for the RCA Víctor and Okeh labels between 1931 and 1942.

== Biography ==
Fernández was born in 1904 in the Guerrero neighborhood of Mexico City to Alberto Fernández García and Sofía Pomar Arellano. She married young, had a daughter, and was widowed shortly after. Her career began in October 1929 when businessman Ricardo Beltri hired her to sing at the Teatro María Guerrero, where she made her debut as the lead singer of a trio of china poblanas with the Martínez sisters. She began singing as a soloist at the Teatro Politeama.

Agustín Lara, one of Mexico's leading songwriters, discovered her among the audience at the Teatro Lírico and immediately chose her to be the performer of his songs. Together with Lara and tenor Juan Arvizu, she performed Lara's songs with great success at the Politeama, Fábregas, and Lírico theaters. In 1930, she became one of the first singers of the XEW radio station. She recorded her first single in 1931 for the RCA Víctor record company.

She married aircraft pilot Luis Boyer Castañeda and retired from singing in the 1940s. She died in 1993.

== Discography ==
=== Singles ===
- "Pervertida" (1931)
- "Capulín" (1931)
- "Cautiva" (1932)
- "Flores viejas" (1932)
- "Vidas cruzadas" (1933)
- "Deseo" (1933)
- "Desilusión" (1933)
- "Mi tienda" (1933)
- "Ya no quero que me queras" (1935)
- "Vaivén" (1936)
- "El coquero" (1936)
- "Fruta verde" (1936)
- "Amor de mis amores" (1936)
- "La bienquerida" (1936)
- "La jaibera" (1936)
- "Negra" (1936)
- "Martirio" (1936)
- "Cosquillas" (1936)
- "Shunka" (1937)
- "Espejito" (1937)
- "Pregones del Papaloapan" (1937)
- "Tierra brava" (1937)
- "Corazón del mar" (1942)
- "Camagüey" (1942)
- "La conga en Veracruz" (1942)
- "Desamor" (1942)

=== Compilation albums ===
- La Cancionera del Estilo Único (RCA Camden)
- Ana María Fernández: reencuentro con la incomparable cancionera del estilo único
