= Rosa Planas Ferrer =

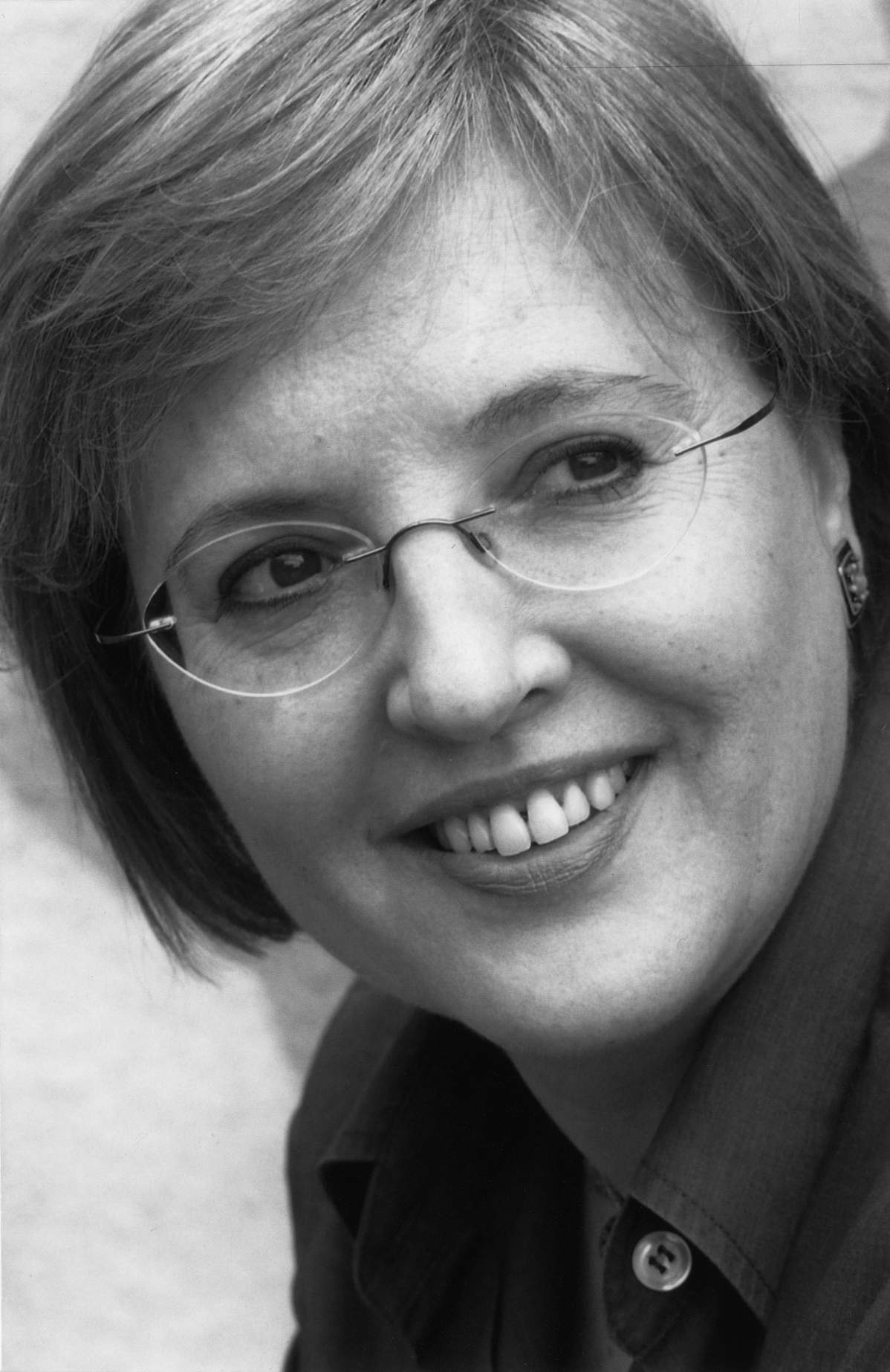
- Born: Maria Rosa Planas Ferrer; 1957 (age 68–69); Palma de Mallorca
- Education: PhD in Philology and Philosophy
- Alma mater: University of the Balearic Islands
- Occupations: poet; novelist; researcher; literary critic
- Writing career
- Language: Spanish, Catalan
- Period: 1982–
- Genres: poetry. novel, essay

Rosa Planas Ferrer (Palma, 1957) is a writer, philologist, literary critic and history researcher.

== Biography ==
Planas Ferrer holds a PhD in Philology and Philosophy by UIB as well as two Licentiate degrees in Philosophy and Letters (major in Hispanic Philology, UIB, 1979; major in Catalan Philology, UIB, 1997).

Rosa Planas publishes literary criticism articles for the Mallorcan press and for a variety of scholarly journals (El Temps, Randa, Transfer, Lluc and Segell, among others). Planas Ferrer is currently (2021) a regular collaborator for the Última Hora newspaper, and has served as member of the editorial board of Lluc and as the editorial secretary of Segell: Revista d'història i cultura jueves.

A bilingual (Catalan and Spanish) author, her literary career started in poetry with Letras de Lluvia (Biblioteca Atlántida, 1982) and Regreso a Belvedere (Ed. Devenir, 1993). Since then Planas Ferrer has engaged in a prolific and intense production dealing both with historical and onomastic research as with fiction, authoring novels that are nuanced and rich in historical and literary references. Her first two novels, L'orador dels ocells (Ed. Moll, 1999) and Abraham Savasorda (Lleonard Muntaner, editor, 2001) received excellent reviews and reception by the readers. L'orador dels ocells was an award finalist at the 1999 Premi Ciutat de Palma, while in 2001 her novel Abraham Savasorda was awarded the I Premio Alexandre Ballester. Her literary activity reached its peak with two works published by Planeta: Las máscaras de Florencia (2004), originally appeared both in Catalan and Spanish, and then translated to Russian (by Vladimir Pravosudov, Azbooka Pub., 2008); and La ciutat dels espies indefensos (2006), originally written in Catalan and translated to German (Valentia Pub., 2007) on occasion of the Frankfurt Book Fair, in its edition dedicated to Catalan literature. Rosa Planas was invited to the Fair as a guest author.

Her research spans throughout a variety of subjects, from history and onomastics to literary essay and Jewish studies). Among her finest scholarly works are Els malnoms dels xuetes de Mallorca (s. XVII-XX), (Lleonard Muntaner, editor, 2003), Literatura i holocaust: Aproximació a una escriptura de crisi (Lleonard Muntaner, Editor, 2006), Introducción al patrimonio cultural (Editorial Trea, 2006), and Ramon Llull i l'alquímia (with Francesca Tugores, Lleonard Muntaner, Editor, 2014). Regarding Raimon Llull, Planas published Del Doctor Il·luminat al Doctor Fosc: De Ramon Llull al Doctor Faust (J.J. de Olañeta, 2017), comparing the philosopher and the myth of Faust; the biography of Mallorcan mystic Margarida Mas Pujol: Anna Maria del Santíssim Sagrament. Vull fer càtedra del teu cor (Ajuntament de Palma, 2017); an essay on books and libraries Libre entre Libros (J.J. de Olañeta, 2019; published in Catalan as Lliure entre Llibres); and a study on funerary death rituals in 19th century Mallorca, L'espectacle de la mort a la Mallorca del segle XIX (Lleonard Muntaner, 2020).

Rosa Planas' literary works earned her the Ramon Llull Award, awarded by the Government of the Balearic Islands. In 2015, she was awarded a special mention by Amics del Patrimoni in recognition for her defense of Mallorca's cultural and artistic heritage.

In 2011 Planas Ferrer published La veu de la caputxa (Editorial Columna, 2011) and in 2013 she was awarded the Premi Ciutat de Manacor Maria Antònia Oliver de Novel·la for Nòmina encriptada (Món de Llibres, 2014).

== Works ==
=== Poetry ===
- Letras de Lluvia (finalista Biblioteca Atlántida, 1982)
- Regreso a Belvedere (Ed. Devenir, 1993)
- Calendari íntim (Lleonard Muntaner, editor, 2015)
- Carta din viata inferiora [Llibre de la vida inferior], in Apostrof: Revista a uniunii scriitorilor, year XXVIII, 2017, n. 10 (329). Translated to Romanian by Jana Balacciu Matei.

=== Novel ===
- L'orador dels ocells (Moll, 1999)
- Abraham Savasorda (Lleonard Muntaner, 2001)
- Las máscaras de Florencia (Planeta, 2004), Catalan version.
- La ciutat dels espies indefensos (Planeta, 2006)
- La veu de la caputxa (Columna, 2011)
- Nòmina encriptada (Món de llibres, 2014)

=== Essay ===
- Els malnoms dels xuetes de Mallorca (s. XVII-XX)(Lleonard Muntaner, 2003)
- Literatura i Holocaust: Aproximació a una escriptura de crisi (Lleonard Muntaner, 2006)
- Introducción al patrimonio cultural (Trea, 2006)
- Ramon Llull i l'alquímia (Lleonard Muntaner, 2014
- Del Doctor Il·luminat al Doctor Fosc. De Ramon Llull al Doctor Faust, preface by Lola Badia (José J. De Olañeta, col. La Foradada, 2017)
- Del Doctor Il·luminat al Doctor Fosc. De Ramon Llull al Doctor Faust, preface by Lola Badia (José J. De Olañeta, col. Galatzó, 2017)
- Anna Maria del Santíssim Sagrament. Vull fer càtedra del teu cor (Ajuntament de Palma, 2017)
- Lliure entre Llibres (J.J. de Olañeta, 2019), published by in Spanish as Libre entre Libros (J.J. de Olañeta, 2019).
- L’espectacle de la mort a la Mallorca del segle XIX (Lleonard Muntaner, 2020)

== Awards ==
- Premi Alexandre Ballester de narrativa curta (2001)for Abraham Savasorda
- Medalla Ramon Llull de la Comunitat de les Illes Balears (2007).
- Premi Ciutat de Manacor (2013) for Nòmina encriptada.
