= José Planas (footballer, born 1952) =

Spanish footballer

Personal information
- Full name: José Planas Planas
- Date of birth: 12 April 1952 (age 74)
- Place of birth: Llubí, Spain
- Position: Midfielder

Senior career*
| Years | Team | Apps | (Gls) |
| 1975–1979 | Terrassa | 137 | (12) |
| 1979–1981 | Granada | 74 | (4) |
| 1981–1982 | Sabadell | 33 | (5) |
| Total | | 254 | (21) |
- * Club domestic league appearances and goals

José Planas Planas (born 12 April 1952) is a Spanish former professional footballer who played as a midfielder.

== Career ==
Born in Llubí, Planas played for Terrassa, Granada and Sabadell.
