= Estudis Romànics =

Literary magazine

Estudis Romànics (ER) was a literary magazine founded in 1947 by Ramon Aramon Serra. It is based in Barcelona.

Since 2000 and until 2014, it was directed by Antoni Maria Badia i Margarit, emeritus member of the Philological Section of the IEC, who has the collaboration of the Editing Committee, and the advice of the Scientific Council. Since 2004 Joan Veny i Clar was co-director and is its current director.

The Estudis Romànics is issued every year, and they are devoted to linguistics, philology, literary criticism and Romance-speaking Europe literatures, without limits of matters, method or chronology. This magazine gathers global and particular contributions from each language.

The ER volumes have three parts:

- Articles.
- Recensions.
- Reports.

The ER collaborations are written mainly in any romance language (or also in German or in English). The official editing language is Catalan.
