= List of Portuguese women writers =

This is a list of women writers who were born in Portugal or whose writings are closely associated with that country.

== A ==
- Isabel Alçada (born 1950), children's writer
- Rita Almeida (born 1974), economist, non-fiction writer
- Ana Filomena Amaral (born 1961), historian, novelist
- Ana Luísa Amaral (1956–2022), poet
- Sophia de Mello Breyner Andresen (1919–2004), poet

== B ==
- Maria Isabel Barreno (1939–2016)
- Sara Beirão (1880–1974)
- Agustina Bessa-Luís (1922–2019), novelist, theatre writer, essayist, children's writer, short story writer
- Mercedes Blasco (1867–1961), memoirist, translator, journalist, novelist and playwright
- Fiama Hasse Pais Brandão (1938–2007), poet, dramatist, translator, essayist
- Lurdes Breda (born 1970), poet and children's writer

== C ==
- Amélia dos Santos Costa Cardia (1855–1938)
- Cláudia de Campos (1859–1916), writer and activist
- Dulce Maria Cardoso (born 1964), novelist
- Maria Amália Vaz de Carvalho (1847–1921)
- Maria Judite de Carvalho (1921–1998), novelist, short story writer, poet, playwright
- Públia Hortênsia de Castro (1548–1595), poet and humanist
- Violante do Ceo (1601 or 1607–1693), poet
- Francisca Clotilde (1862-1935), Brazilian writer
- Sara Pinto Coelho (1913–1990), playwright, novelist, short story writer, and children's writer
- Maria Rosa Colaço (1935–2004), children's writer and journalist
- Clara Pinto Correia (born 1960), novelist, journalist
- Hélia Correia (born 1949)
- Natália Correia (1923–1993), poet, novelist, essayist
- Maria Velho da Costa (1938–2020)

== D ==
- Luísa Dacosta (1927–2015)
- Ana Daniel (1928–2011), poet
- Vimala Devi (born 1932), writer, poet, translator

== E ==
- Florbela Espanca (1894–1930), poet
- Sofia Ester (born 1978)

== F ==
- Rosa Lobato de Faria (1932–2010), scriptwriter, novelists, poet, songwriter
- Susana Félix (born 1975), songwriter
- Lília da Fonseca (1906-1991), feminist writer and journalist
- Raquel Freire (born 1973), screenwriter, novelist

== G ==
- Joana da Gama (c. 1520–1586), author
- Teolinda Gersão (born 1940), novelist, educator
- Luísa Costa Gomes, chronicler, librettist, novelist, playwright, screenwriter
- Ana Maria Gonçalves (born 1970), novelist
- Olga Gonçalves (1929–2004), poet, novelist
- Maria Teresa Maia Gonzalez (born 1958), children's writer, writer of young adult literature
- Lutegarda Guimarães de Caires (1873–1935), poet and women's rights activist
- Regina Guimarães (born 1957), poet, playwright, lyricist

== H ==
- Ana Hatherly (1929–2015), poet, pioneer of experimental poetry
- Maria Teresa Horta (1937–2025), feminist poet, journalist

== J ==
- Lídia Jorge (born 1946), novelist

== L ==
- Bernarda de Lacerda (1596–1644), playwright
- Irene Lisboa (1892–1958), short story writer, poet, essayist, educational writer
- Susan Lowndes Marques (1907–1993), travel books about Portugal

== M ==
- Maria Aurora (1937–2010), journalist, poet, novelist, children's writer, associated with Madeira
- Isa Meireles (c. 1932–2008), journalist, children's writer
- Eugénia Melo e Castro (born 1958), songwriter
- Pilar Homem de Melo (born 1963), songwriter
- Isabel Meyrelles (born 1929), poet, sculptor
- Amélia Muge (born 1952), lyricist

== O ==
- Raquel Ochoa (born 1980), journalist, travel writer and novelist

== P ==
- Inês Pedrosa (born 1962), journalist, novelist, short story writer, children's writer, playwright
- Ana Teresa Pereira (born 1958), novelist
- Ana Plácido (1831–1895), novelist

== S ==
- Isabel Stilwell (born 1960) Historical novels

== V ==
- Joana Vaz (c. 1500–1570), Latin scholar and poet
- Amélia Veiga (born 1931), Portuguese-born Angolan poet, educator
- Mafalda Veiga (born 1965), songwriter
- Ana Vicente (1943–2015), feminist and children's writer
- Alice Vieira (born 1943), children's writer
- Virgínia Vitorino (1895–1967), poet and playwright

== See also ==
- List of Portuguese writers
- List of women writers
