= List of Portuguese writers =

This is a list of Portuguese writers, ordered alphabetically by surname.

== A ==
- João Aguiar (1943–2010)
- Manuel Alegre (born 1936), poet
- Afonso de Albuquerque (1453–1515)
- Ana Filomena Amaral (born 1961), novelist
- Ana Luísa Amaral (1956–2022)
- Eugénio de Andrade pseudonym of José Fontinhas (1923–2005), poet
- Maria Archer (1899–1982)
- Carlos Lobo de Ávila (1860-1895)

== B ==
- António Gonçalves de Bandarra (1500–1556)
- Ana de Sousa Baptista (born 1971)
- João de Barros (1496–1570), historian
- Ruy Belo (1933–1978)
- Al Berto pseudonym of Alberto Raposo Pidwell Tavares (1948–1997), poet
- Sara Beirão (1880–1974)
- Francisco Manuel de Melo Breyner (1837–1903)
- Agustina Bessa-Luís (1922–2019)
- Mercedes Blasco (1867–1961)
- Abel Botelho (1855–1917)
- Inês Botelho (born 1986)
- António Botto (1892–1959)
- Fiama Hasse Pais Brandão (1938–2007)
- Raul Brandão (1867–1930)
- Lurdes Breda (born 1970)

== C ==
- António Cabral (1931–2007)
- Luís de Camões (1527–1580)
- Miguel Esteves Cardoso (born 1955)
- Fernão Lopes de Castanheda (1500–1559)
- Camilo Castelo Branco (1825–1890)
- António Feliciano de Castilho (1800–1875)
- Eugénio de Castro (1869–1944)
- Ferreira de Castro (1898–1974)
- Públia Hortênsia de Castro (1548–1595), humanist and courtier
- Maria Rosa Colaço (1935–2004), children's writer and journalist
- Gaspar Correia (1492–1563), 16th-century historian
- Hélia Correia (born 1949)
- Natália Correia (1923–1993)
- Maria Velho da Costa (1938–2020)

== D ==
- Luísa Dacosta (1927–2015)
- Júlio Dantas (1876–1962), journalist, writer
- João de Deus (1830–1896), poet, writer, teacher of a new read-learning method
- José António Duro (1875–1899), poet

== E ==
- Florbela Espanca (1894–1930), poet, writer
- Sofia Ester (born 1978)

== F ==
- Cristóvão Falcão (1512–1557)
- José Fernandes Fafe, (1927–2017)
- António Ferreira (poet) (1528–1569)
- José Gomes Ferreira (1900–1985)
- Vergílio Ferreira (1916–1996)
- Lília da Fonseca (1906-1991)
- Manuel da Fonseca (1911–1993)
- Raquel Freire (born 1973), screenwriter, novelist

== G ==
- Joana da Gama (c. 1520–1586)
- Almeida Garrett (1799–1854), playwright
- António Gedeão (1906–1997), writer, doctor, poet
- Augusto Gil (1873–1929), poet
- Damião de Góis (1502–1574)
- Vasco Graça Moura (1942–2014)
- Pedro Guilherme-Moreira (born 1969)

== H ==
- Herberto Helder (1930–2015), poet
- Alexandre Herculano (1810–1877), writer, poet, major historian
- Maria Teresa Horta (1937–2025)

== J ==
- Lídia Jorge (born 1946)
- Guerra Junqueiro (1850–1923)

== L ==
- Irene Lisboa (1892–1958), poet, essayist
- Maria Gabriela Llansol (1931–2008)
- Rosa Lobato Faria (1932–2010)
- António Lobo Antunes (1942–2026)
- Fernão Lopes (1385–1460)

== M ==
- António de Macedo (1931–2017)
- Álvaro Magalhães (born 1951)
- Maria Aurora (1937–2010), poet, novelist, children's writer
- Sophia de Mello Breyner Andresen (1919–2004)
- Joaquim Pedro de Oliveira Martins (1845-1894)
- Francisco Manuel de Melo (1608–1666)
- José Bragança de Miranda (born 1953), essayist
- Wenceslau de Moraes (1854–1929), poet, writer, orientalist
- David Mourão-Ferreira (1927–1996), poet, novelist, critic
- Valter Hugo Mãe (1971-)

== N ==
- Almada Negreiros (1893–1970)
- Vitorino Nemésio (1901–1978)
- António Nobre (1867–1900), poet

== O ==
- Raquel Ochoa (born 1980)
- Carlos de Oliveira (1921–1981)
- Alexandre O'Neill (1924–1986)
- Ramalho Ortigão (1836–1915)
- Ana de Castro Osório (1873–1935), writer, journalist, pioneer of feminism

== P ==
- Luiz Pacheco (1925–2008), writer, polemist, literature critic
- Teixeira de Pascoaes (1877–1952), poet, writer
- Inês Pedrosa (born 1962), journalist, novelist, short story writer, children's writer, playwright
- José Luís Peixoto (born 1974)
- Soeiro Pereira Gomes (1909–1949), neo-realist writer
- Camilo Pessanha (1867–1926), poet
- Fernando Pessoa (1888–1935), poet
- Fernão Mendes Pinto (1509–1583)
- José Cardoso Pires (1925–1998)

== Q ==
- Eça de Queiroz (1845–1900)
- Antero de Quental (1842–1891)

== R ==
- Alves Redol (1911–1969), neo-realist writer
- José Régio pseudonym of José Maria dos Reis Pereira (1901–1969)
- Garcia de Resende (1470–1536)
- Aquilino Ribeiro (1885–1963), neo-realist writer
- Bernardim Ribeiro (1482–1552)
- Francisco Rodrigues Lobo (1580–1622)

== S ==
- Mário de Sá-Carneiro (1890–1916)
- Francisco de Sá de Miranda (1481-1558)
- Bernardo Santareno pseudonym of António Martinho do Rosário (1924–1980)
- Ana Eduarda Santos (born 1983), novelist
- Ary dos Santos (1936–1984), poet
- José Hermano Saraiva (1919-2012), historian
- Rui Miguel Saramago (born 1969)
- José Saramago (1922–2010), Nobel Prize for Literature in 1998
- António Sardinha (1888–1925)
- Agostinho da Silva (1906–1994)
- António José da Silva (1705–1739), dramatist
- Miguel Sousa Tavares (born 1952)
- Isabel Stilwell (born 1960)

== T ==
- Urbano Tavares Rodrigues (1923–2013)
- Manuel Tiago pseudonym of Álvaro Cunhal (1913–2005)
- Miguel Torga (1907–1955)

== V ==
- Mário Cesariny de Vasconcelos (1923–2006), poet
- Joana Vaz (c. 1500 – after 1570), poet and courtier
- Álvaro Velho (15th–16th century)
- Fernando Venâncio (1944–2025)
- Cesário Verde (1855–1886), poet
- Gil Vicente (1465–1537)

== Z ==
- Gomes Eanes de Zurara (died 1474)
- Richard Zimler (born 1956)

== See also ==
- List of Portuguese-language poets
- List of Portuguese novelists
- List of Portuguese women writers
- List of Mozambican writers
