= List of Portuguese novelists =

This is a list of Portuguese novelists.

Ana Filomena Amaral

== C ==
- Mario de Carvalho (born 1944)
- Camilo Castelo Branco (1825–1890)
- Luísa Costa Gomes
- Afonso Cruz (born 1971)

== D ==
- Júlio Dinis (1839–1871)
- José Riço Direitinho (born 1965)

== F ==
- Rosa Lobato de Faria (1932–2010)
- Vergílio Ferreira (1916–1996)
- Raquel Freire (born 1973)

== G ==
- Almeida Garrett (1799–1854)
- Olga Gonçalves (1929–2004)
- Pedro Guilherme-Moreira (born 1969)

== H ==
- Alexandre Herculano (1810–1877)
- Maria Teresa Horta (1937–2025)

== L ==
- António Lobo Antunes (1942–2026)

== M ==
- valter hugo mãe (born 1971)
- Dulce Maria Cardoso (born 1964)
- Guilherme de Melo (1931–2013)
- Luís de Sttau Monteiro (1926–1993)

== N ==
- Fernando Goncalves Namora (1919–1989)
- Vitorino Nemésio (1901–1978)
- António de Vasconcelos Nogueira (born 1961)

== O ==
- Raquel Ochoa (born 1980)
- Carlos de Oliveira (1921–1981)

== P ==
- José Luís Peixoto (born 1974)
- Ana Teresa Pereira (born 1958)
- Ana Plácido (1831–1895)

== Q ==
- José Maria de Eça de Queirós (1845–1900)
- Francisco Teixeira de Queiroz (1848–1919)

== R ==
- Wanda Ramos (1948–1998)
- Aquilino Ribeiro (1885–1963)

== S ==
- Rui Miguel Saramago (born 1969)
- José Saramago (1922–2010)

== T ==
- Gonçalo M. Tavares (born 1970)
- Miguel Sousa Tavares (born 1952)

== Z ==
- Richard Zimler (born 1956)

== See also ==
- List of Portuguese writers
- Portuguese literature
- List of novelists by nationality
