= Amor de Perdição (disambiguation) =

Amor de Perdição is a 19th-century Portuguese novel by Camilo Castelo Branco

Amor de Perdição may also refer to:

- Amor de Perdição (TV series), a Brazilian telenovela based on the novel
- Amor de Perdição (1978 film), a Portuguese film based on the novel
- Amor de Perdição (1943 film), a Portuguese film based on the novel
