= Rubén Torrecilla =

Spanish footballer

Personal information
- Full name: Rubén Torrecilla González
- Date of birth: 24 May 1979 (age 47)
- Place of birth: Jarandilla de la Vera, Spain
- Height: 1.84 m (6 ft 0 in)
- Position: Midfielder

Youth career
- Extremadura

Senior career*
Years	Team	Apps	(Gls)
1998–2003	Extremadura	24	(0)
2001	→ Novelda (loan)	11	(1)
2002	→ Novelda (loan)	2	(0)
2003–2004	Novelda	32	(1)
2004–2006	Castellón	66	(2)
2006–2007	Ciudad Murcia	37	(1)
2007–2008	Granada 74	31	(1)
2008–2009	Alicante	26	(2)
2009–2010	Granada	13	(2)
Total		242	(10)

Managerial career
- 2011–2012: Alhendín (youth)
- 2012–2016: Alhendín
- 2016–2017: Cubillas
- 2017–2021: Granada (youth)
- 2021–2022: Granada B
- 2022: Granada (caretaker)
- 2022: Castellón
- 2023–2025: Hércules
- * Club domestic league appearances and goals

Rubén Torrecilla González (born 24 May 1979) is a Spanish football manager and former football player.

He amassed Segunda División totals of 137 games and five goals over the course of seven seasons, representing five teams.

== Playing career ==
Born in Jarandilla de la Vera, Cáceres, Torrecilla started his career at CF Extremadura and broke into the first team in 1999, but only appeared in eight games in two-and-a-half second division seasons combined. He moved to third level side Novelda CF midway through both the 2000–01 and 2001–02 seasons, on loan without any success.

From 2005 to 2009, after another spell with Novelda, Torrecilla played one season each in division two with CD Castellón, Ciudad de Murcia, Granada 74 CF (created upon the disappearance of the former) and Alicante CF (freshly promoted into that tier).

In January 2010, aged only 30, Torrecilla retired from football, having been released by Granada CF after not being able to recover from his knee injury after a fourth surgery. He still contributed with two goals as the club returned to the second division after 22 years of absence.

== Managerial career ==
Shortly after retiring, Torrecilla started working as the manager of CB Alhendín's Juvenil side, before being named manager of the first team in the Regional Preferente. Ahead of the 2016–17 season, he took over FC Cubillas in the Primera Andaluza.

Torrecilla left Cubillas on 29 June 2017 after not renewing his contract, and returned to Granada shortly after, being named manager of the Juvenil B side. He became the manager of the Juvenil A team in 2018, before being named in charge of the reserve team on 15 February 2021.

On 6 March 2022, Torrecilla was named caretaker manager of Granada, after the dismissal of Robert Moreno. He made his top-flight debut six days later, in a 1–0 home loss to Elche CF. After winning and drawing once each in a five-game spell, ending with 4–1 loss at home to Levante UD, Aitor Karanka was installed in his place.

On 15 July 2022, Torrecilla was named manager of Primera División RFEF side CD Castellón. On 18 December, after just five months in charge, he was sacked, and took over Hércules CF in Segunda Federación on 8 July 2023.

Torrecilla led Hércules to the third division in his first year, and despite managing to avoid relegation in his second, he was sacked on 17 November 2025 after a poor run of form.

== Managerial statistics ==
As of 16 November 2025

Managerial record by team and tenure
Team	Nat	From	To	Record								Ref
Team	Nat	From	To	G	W	D	L	GF	GA	GD	Win %	Ref
Alhendín	(Spain)	1 July 2012	30 June 2016	132	72	24	36	285	178	+107	54.55	
Cubillas	(Spain)	8 July 2016	28 June 2017	34	20	8	6	63	28	+35	58.82	
Recreativo Granada	(Spain)	16 February 2021	6 March 2022	36	13	15	8	36	27	+9	36.11	
Granada	(Spain)	6 March 2022	17 April 2022	5	1	1	3	8	13	−5	20.00	
Castellón	(Spain)	15 July 2022	18 December 2022	17	8	5	4	23	14	+9	47.06	
Hércules	(Spain)	8 July 2023	17 November 2025	86	36	18	32	113	95	+18	41.86	
Career total				310	150	71	89	528	355	+173	48.39	—
