= Maria, Duchess of Viseu =

Portuguese princess and influential patron of the arts

Maria
- Duchess of Viseu
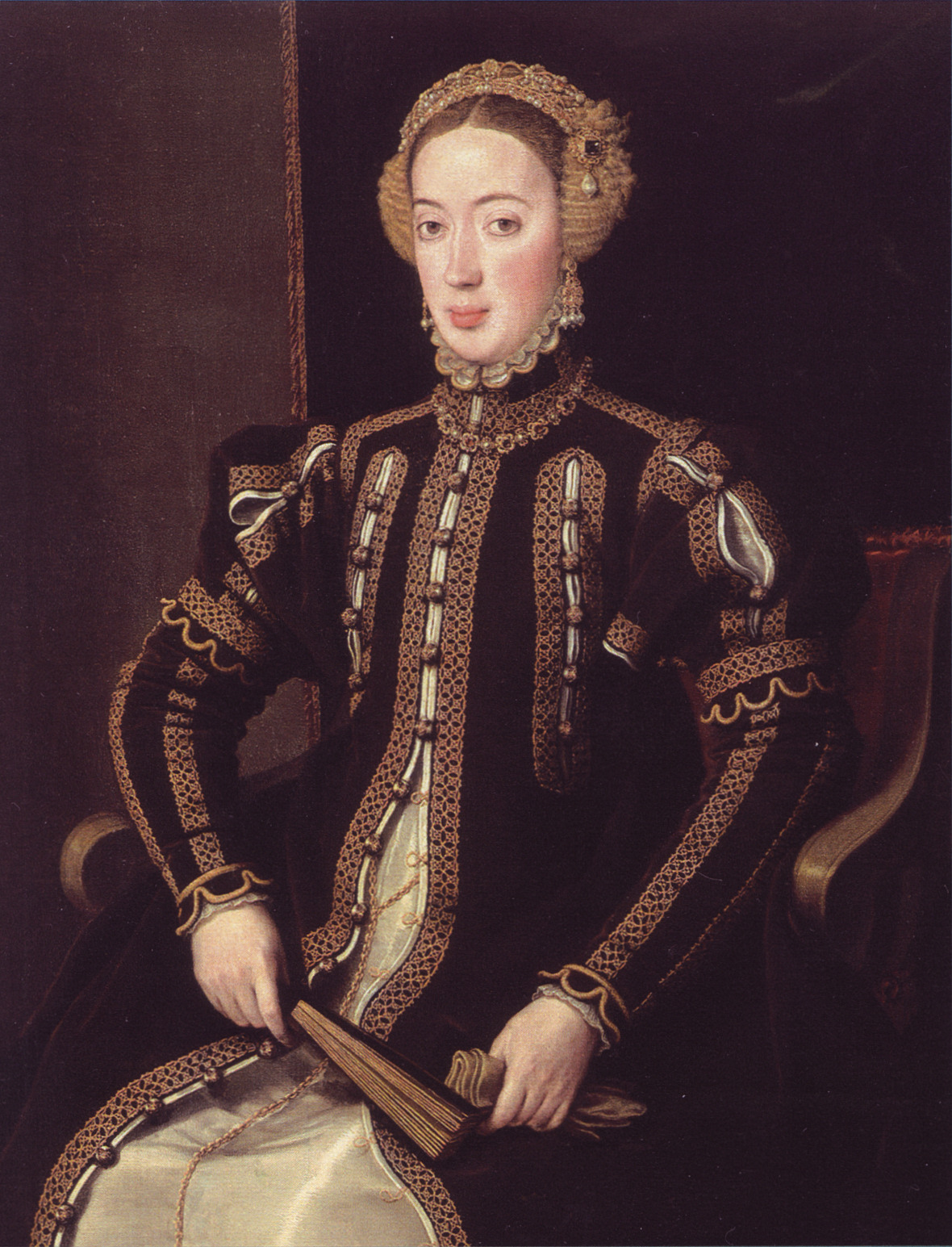
- Portrait by Anthonis Mor (c. 1550–1555)
- Born: 18 June 1521; Lisbon, Kingdom of Portugal
- Died: 10 October 1577 (aged 56); Lisbon, Kingdom of Portugal
- Burial: Church of Our Lady of Luz, Lisbon
- House: Aviz
- Father: Manuel I of Portugal
- Mother: Eleanor of Austria

Infanta Maria, Duchess of Viseu (18 June 1521 – 10 October 1577; Portuguese pronunciation: [mɐˈɾiɐ]) was an infanta of Portugal, the only daughter of King Manuel I of Portugal and his third wife, Eleanor of Austria. A noted patron of the arts and buildings, Maria's personal wealth rivaled that of her half-brother, King John III of Portugal, making her the richest woman in Portugal and one of the wealthiest princesses in Europe.

== Youth ==
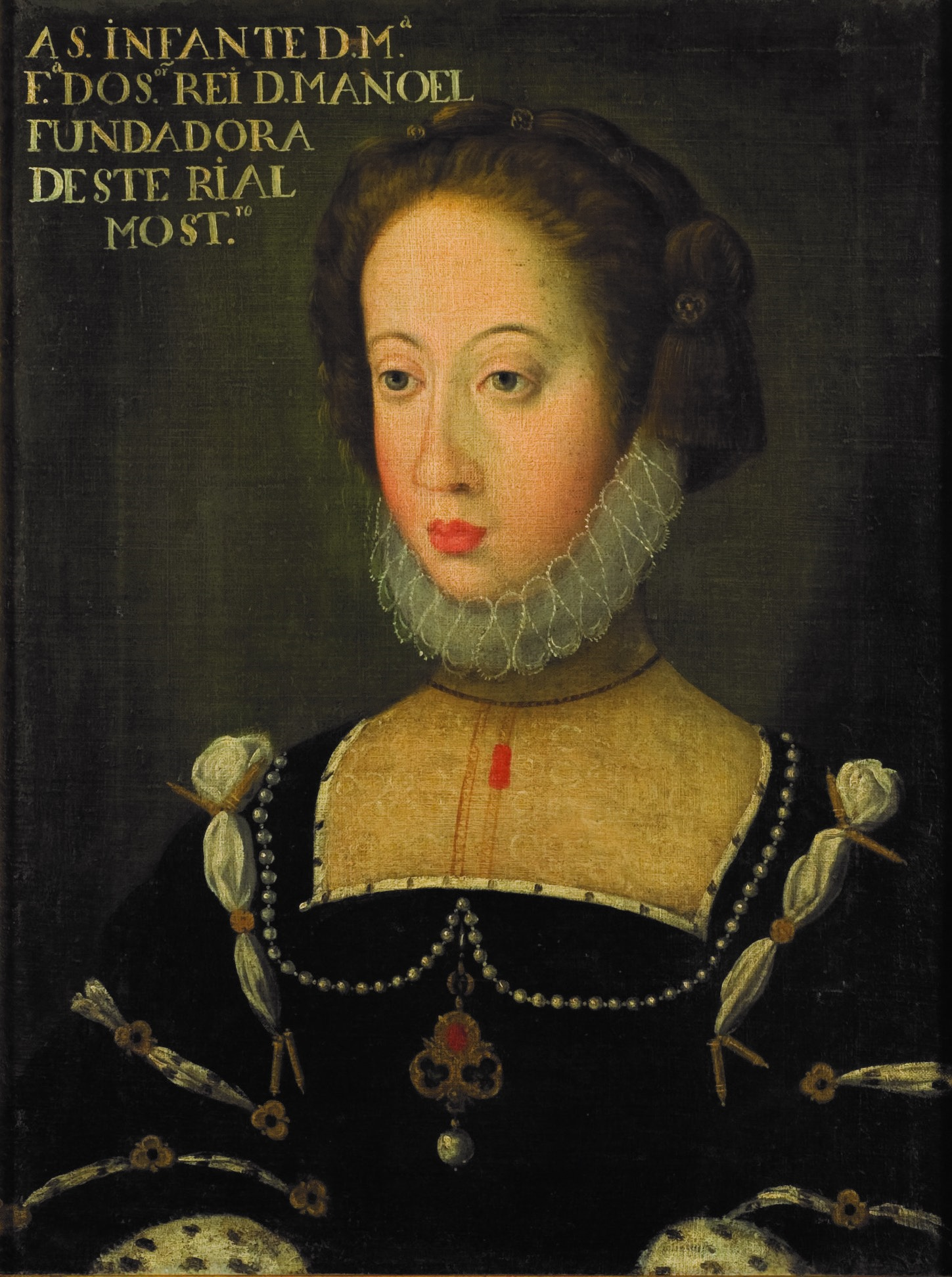
Infanta Maria of Portugal by Francisco de Holanda; c. 1540s. She was a renowned beauty of a pale complexion and clear blue eyes.

Maria de Avíz was born on 18 June 1521, in Lisbon, Portugal. She was the only daughter of King Manuel I of Portugal and Infanta Eleanor of Austria. Five months after her birth, her father died of the plague and was succeeded by her half-brother, John III of Portugal. Shortly afterwards, in May 1523, her mother departed to Spain, leaving Maria to be raised in Portugal at her half-brother's court.

In 1525 her maternal aunt, Catherine of Austria, married John III of Portugal. The Queen took care of the upbringing and education of Maria, who was loved like one of her own daughters. Maria's education was astounding for a woman of her time since her teachers included female scholars, such as humanists Joana Vaz, Luisa Sigeia, and Públia Hortênsia de Castro. Lessons included finances, architecture, literature, and several languages. One of the most educated of the Portuguese infantas, Maria became a famed humanist and protector of the arts. Her household was made into an intellectual circle that welcomed women of letters. It was rumored that she fell in love with Portugal's greatest poet, Luís de Camões.

Although she did not lack suitors and had several marriage proposals, Maria never married. Her engagement with Dauphin Francis was negotiated with the support of her mother Eleanor, (Note: Eleanor had married Francis I of France in 1530 on the condition that the Dauphin and Maria would marry in 1533.) but the prince died in 1536. After his death, Eleanor tried to arrange a marriage between Maria and the Dauphin's younger brother, Charles II of Orléans, in hopes that the prospective match would enable Maria to join her at the French court. Despite Eleanor's endeavors, the marriage did not materialize because Charles V and John III did not like the idea of Maria's immense wealth being at the disposal of France. In 1537, Maria and her cousin Christina, Dowager Duchess of Milan, were briefly considered as possible brides for Henry VIII of England. However, England soon dropped any pursuit. Maria was considered as a second wife for her cousin and half-nephew, the future Philip II of Spain, son of her uncle, Emperor Charles V, and her half-sister Isabella. The matter was taken under serious consideration from 1549 onward, when her mother settled in Brussels, but these plans were discontinued when Mary Tudor succeeded to the English throne in 1553 and Charles V decided to marry his son Philip to a monarch. Other candidates for her hand were Archduke Maximilian of Austria; his father Ferdinand I, Holy Roman Emperor; James V of Scotland; and the Duke of Savoy.

== Duchess of Viseu ==
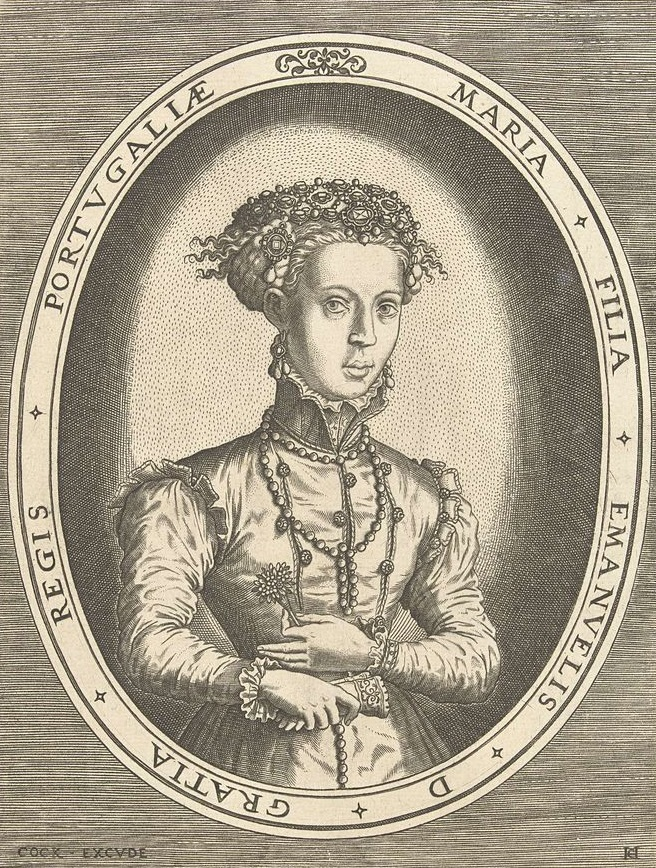
Maria, Duchess of Viseu, by Hieronymus Cock, c. 1554–1556.

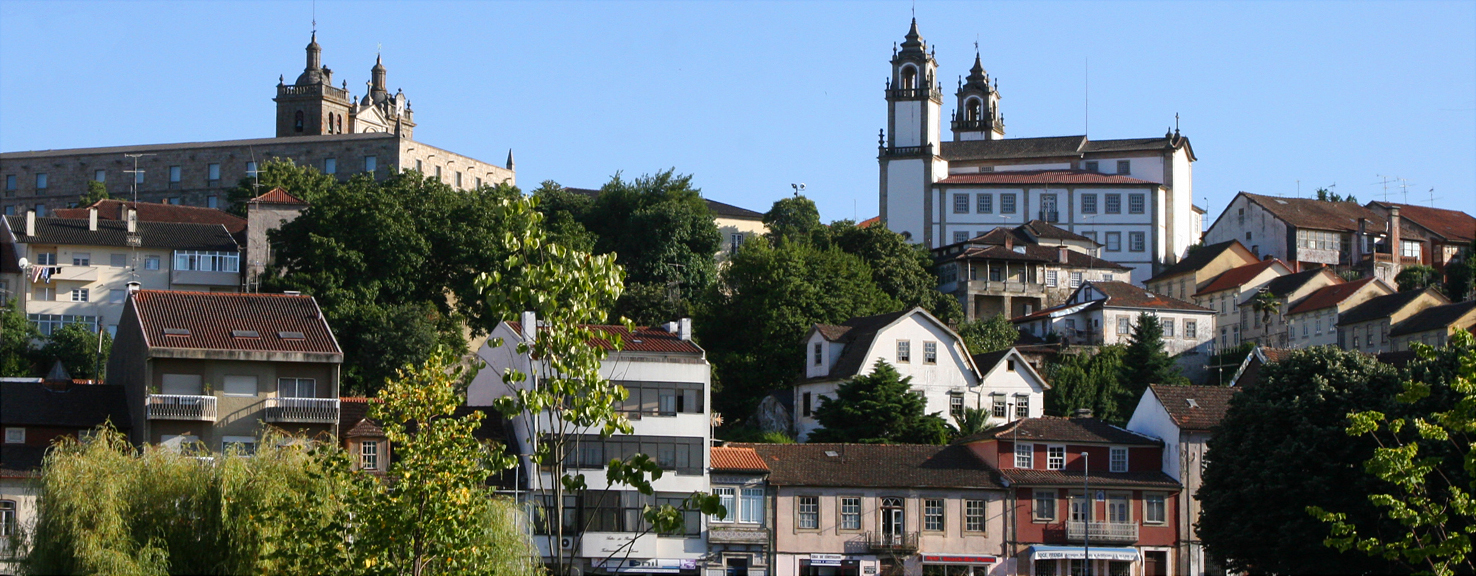
Viseu's historic center

Eventually, King John III gave Maria her own household and the Duchy of Viseu, which their father owned before he became king. Under her rule, the city continued and prospered its several industries of pottery, embroidery and copper. Her personal wealth eventually rivaled that of the king, making her the richest woman in Portugal and one of the wealthiest princesses in Europe.

Receiving such incomes, Maria sponsored several building projects, particularly in Carnide and the Lisbon countryside. She financed and supervised the construction of the Church of Nossa Senhora da Luz and the Hospital of Nossa Senhora dos Prazeres, which currently houses the Colégio Militar, both of which still boast large reliefs of her personal coat of arms. In Lisbon, she sponsored the construction of the Church of Santa Engrácia, in São Vicente. The original structure she ordered to be built would be completely destroyed in 1681, which would lead to the construction of the new current church, which now serves as the National Pantheon of Portugal.

== Later life ==
After her half-brother John's death in 1557, Maria went to Spain to meet her widowed mother for the first time in decades. Eleanor asked her unwed daughter to come and live with her and her aunt Mary, but Maria refused the request and only remained there for three weeks before returning to Lisbon. Eleanor died very shortly afterwards on her return journey to Jarandilla de la Vera from Badajoz.

During the tumultuous period of the minority of young King Sebastian, a faction of the Portuguese nobility wanted the Duchess of Viseu to replace Queen Dowager Catherine as regent, but these plans came to nothing. Maria died in Lisbon on 10 October 1577, at the age of 56. She was initially buried in the Madre de Deus Convent but her remains were transferred to the Church of Nossa Senhora da Luz in 1597.

== See also ==
- Descendants of Manuel I of Portugal

== Notes ==
Maria, Duchess of Viseu House of Aviz Born: 18 June 1521 Died: 10 October 1557
Portuguese nobility
Vacant Title last held by Manuel I of Portugal	Duchess of Viseu	Vacant Title next held by Prince Miguel, Duke of Viseu
