= Igreja de Nossa Senhora da Luz (Carnide) =

Church in Lisbon, Portugal

Coordinates: 38.761981°N 9.1878248°W

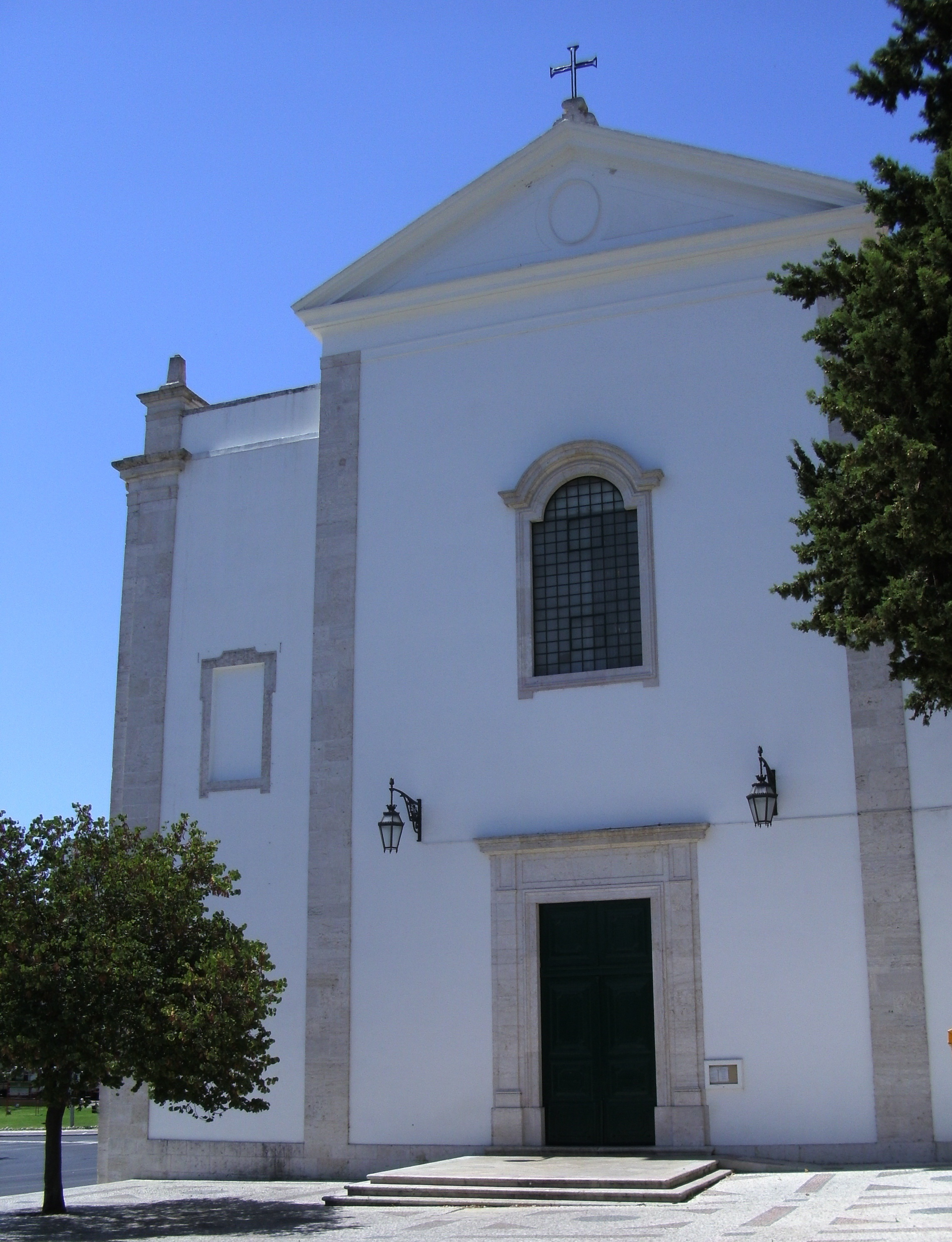
Igreja de Nossa Senhora da Luz

The Church-Shrine of Our Lady of Light (Portuguese: Igreja-Santuário de Nossa Senhora da Luz) is a Marian shrine and Catholic church in freguesia Carnide of Lisbon, Portugal. It is classified as a National Monument.

== About ==
The construction of the Church of Our Lady of Light was initiated by Maria, daughter of Manuel I and Eleanor. It was built between 1575 and 1596. The church was destroyed as the result of 1755 earthquake. Only the main chapel, the arc, and part of walls survived. The current facade was built in 1870 by the architect Valentim Correia. The grave of Infanta D. Maria was classified as National Monument in 1910, and the main chapel was listed as National Monument in 1923.

== See also ==
- List of churches in Portugal
