= Doomed Love (2008 film) =

- Directed by: Mário Barroso
- Based on: Amor de Perdição by Camilo Castelo Branco
- Starring: Tomás Alves; Ana Moreira; Rafael Morais; Patrícia Franco; Willion Brandão; Catarina Wallenstein
- Release date: 13 August 2008 (LIFF); 23 April 2009 (Portugal)
- Country: Portugal
- Language: Portuguese

Doomed Love (Portuguese: Um Amor de Perdição) is a 2008 Portuguese film directed by Mário Barroso.

== Cast ==
- Tomás Alves as Simão Botelho
- Ana Moreira as Teresa Albuquerque
- Rafael Morais as Manuel Botelho
- Patrícia Franco as Rita Botelho
- Willion Brandão as Zé Xavier
- Catarina Wallenstein as Mariana da Cruz
- Ana Padrão as Preciosa Botelho
- Rui Morisson as Domingos Botelho
- Virgílio Castelo as João da Cruz

== Reception ==
It won the 2010 Portuguese Golden Globe for Best Film.
