= Nicolas Chorier =

French lawyer, writer, and historian

- Born: September 1, 1612; Vienne, France
- Died: August 14, 1692 (aged 79); Grenoble, France
- Occupations: Lawyer, writer, historian
- Writing career
- Period: Restoration France
- Genre: French history
- Subjects: Local history, erotica

Nicolas Chorier (September 1, 1612 – August 14, 1692) was a French lawyer, writer, and historian. He is known especially for his historical works on Dauphiné, as well as his erotic dialogue called The School of Women, or The Seven Flirtatious Encounters of Aloisia (French: L'Academie des dames, ou les Sept entretiens galants d'Aloisia).

He was born at Vienne, in present-day Isère. He practised as a lawyer in Grenoble and then as a prosecutor for King Louis XIV. His works on Dauphiné remain an important source for historians to this day. He died at Grenoble in his eightieth year.

== The School of Women ==
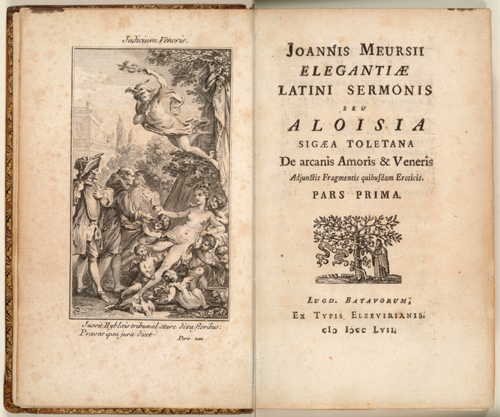
1757 Latin edition of The School of Women

The School of Women first appeared as a work in Latin entitled Aloisiae Sigaeae, Toletanae, Satyra sotadica de arcanis Amoris et Veneris. This manuscript claimed that it was originally written in Spanish by Luisa Sigea de Velasco, an erudite poet and maid of honor at the court of Lisbon and was then translated into Latin by Jean or Johannes Meursius, a humanist professor teaching history in Leiden, Holland since 1610. The attribution to Sigea was a lie and Meursius' involvement was a complete fabrication. The manuscript circulated through the libertine community at the beginning of the eighteenth century and was known in Latin under many different titles. It was translated into French many times, including one translation by Jean Terrasson in 1750, and was also translated into English.

The book is written in the form of a series of dialogues with Tullia, a twenty-six-year-old Italian woman, the wife of Callias, who is charged with the sexual initiation of her young cousin, Ottavia, to whom she declares, "Your mother asked me to reveal to you the most mysterious secrets of the bridal bed and to teach you what you must be with your husband, which your husband will also be, touching these small things which so strongly inflame men's passion. This night, so that I can teach you above all in a freer language, we will sleep together in my bed, which I would like to be able to say will have been the softest of Venus's lace."

=== Editions ===
- 1660: Aloisiae Sigeae Toletanae Satyra sotadica de arcanis Amoris et Veneris; Aloisia Hispanice scripsit; Latinitate donavit Ioannes Meursius. Gratianopoli (imprint is fictitious)
- 1678 (ca.): Aloisiae Sigaeae Toletanae Satyra sotadica de arcanis Amoris & Veneris ... accessit colloquium ante hac non editum, Fescennini, ex m.s. recens reperto. Editio nova, emendatior & auctior. Amstelodami (or rather Geneva?)
- 1757: Joannis Meursii Elegantiae Latini sermonis seu Aloisia Sigæa Toletana de arcanis Amoris et Veneris; adjunctis fragmentis quibusdam eroticis. Lugduni Batavorum: Ex typis Elzevirianis [or rather, Paris: Barbou]
- 1969: Des secrets de l'amour et de Vénus, satire sotadique de Luisa Sigea, de Tolède, par Nicolas Chorier, préface d'André Berry. Éditions l'Or du Temps
- 1999: L'Académie des dames ou la Philosophie dans le boudoir du Grand Siècle; dialogues érotiques présentés par Jean-Pierre Dubost. Arles: Éditions Philippe Picquier
- 2021: School of Women; Sunny Lou Publishing, ISBN 978-1-95539-214-3

== Other works ==
- The Research of Sire Chorier on the history of the city of Vienne, metropolis of Allobroges (French: Les recherches du sieur Chorier sur les antiquitez de la ville de Vienne, métropole des Allobroges) (1658).
- Genealogical History of the House of Sassenage, related to the counts of Lion and of Forests (French: Histore généalogique de la maison de Sassenage, branche des anciens comtes de Lion et de Forests) (1669).
- A General History of Dauphiné (French: Histoire générale de Dauphiné) (1671–72). Reprinted in 1971.
- The Political State of the Province of Dauphiné, supplement to the Political State of the Country of Dauphiné (French: L’Estat politique de la province de Dauphiné, supplément à l’Estat politique du pays de Dauphiné) (1671–72).
- History of Dauphiné, abridged for His Royal Highness the Dauphin (French: Histoire de Dauphiné, abrégée pour monseigneur le Dauphin) (1674)
- The Nobility of the Province of Dauphiné (French: Le Nobiliaire de la province de Dauphiné) (1697)
- Life of Artus Prunier of Saint-André, Adviser to the King in his Council of State and Private, First President of the Parliaments of Provence and Dauphiné (1548–1616), based on a Manuscript by Nicolas Chorier, published with an Introduction, Notes, Appendices, and the unedited Correspondence of Saint-André by Alfred Vellot (French: Vie d'Artus Prunier de Saint-André, conseiller du Roy en ses conseils d'Estat et privé, premier président aux parlements de Provence et de Dauphiné (1548–1616), d'après un manuscrit inédit de Nicolas Chorier, publié avec introduction, notes, appendices et la correspondance inédite de Saint-André) (1880)
- Memoirs of Nicolas Chorier on his life and affairs, translated from three books in Latin inserted into the fourth volume of the "Bulletin of the Statistical Society of the Department of Isère" by Félix Crozet (French: Mémoires de Nicolas Chorier sur sa vie et ses affaires, traduits des trois livres en texte latin insérés dans le 4e volume du « Bulletin de la Société de statistique du département de l'Isère ») (1868)
