= The Return (Cardoso novel) =

Novel by Dulce Maria Cardoso

- Author: Dulce Maria Cardoso
- Translator: Angel Gurria-Quintana
- Language: Portuguese
- Genre: historical fiction
- Set in: Luanda, Angola and Estoril, Portugal
- Published: March 2012
- Publisher: Tinta da China, Quercus Publishing
- English publication date: 13 July 2017
- Pages: 272
- Awards: 2016 PEN Translates award
- ISBN: 9780857054364

The Return is a historical fiction novel by the Portuguese writer, Dulce Maria Cardoso, which describes the experiences of Portuguese citizens in Portugal's colonies who were forced to return to Portugal as the colonies gained independence in 1974–75. The author was one of those, returning with her family at the age of eleven.

== Historical background ==
Nationalist movements began to emerge in Angola, Guinea-Bissau, Mozambique and other Portuguese colonies at the beginning of the 1960s. The requirement for the Portuguese military to oppose these independence movements became a major grievance among many of the military and those who were conscripted, and was a major factor in the overthrow of the authoritarian Estado Novo government by the Carnation Revolution on 25 April, 1974. The new left-wing government promised independence for the colonies and, from May 1974, Portuguese citizens began to leave those territories and arrive in metropolitan Portugal as refugees, often destitute with few possessions. Figures vary, but it is suggested that up to 800,00 Portuguese returned. These became known as the retornados (returnees), a term that carried a pejorative connotation. It applied specifically to white Portuguese migrants, excluding the returning military and those of African origin. Many of these "returnees" had been born in one of the colonies and had never seen the motherland.

== The novel ==
The novel is written from the perspective of a 15-year-old boy, Rui, initially in the Angolan capital of Luanda. It begins with his reminiscences of his life in Angola. He recalls his mother's mental illness; her rose garden; the half-packed suitcases waiting for the time to leave; the gunfire; and his father setting fire to the eleven trucks of his business so the Angolans couldn't use them. Squatters had taken over the houses of those Portuguese who had already left and shops had been abandoned by their owners who had fled the country. Rui's father was still not prepared to make the decision to leave, until soldiers arrived outside their home and Rui and his father felt they were lucky not to have been murdered. They made their way to the airport, but the father was arrested before they could all leave together.

In Portugal, Rui, his mother and sister are among the lucky ones, being accommodated in a 5-star hotel in Estoril, even though accommodation is cramped, the food is bad and they have to queue for ages to eat. Rui describes the role of the Instituto de Apoio ao Retorno de Nacionais (Institute for assistance to the return of nationals – IARN) as "more generous than God". But, as the families wait to discover what will become of them, it is a shock to discover that the retornados, are received with distrust and hostility: the local girls won't go near the boys in the hotel, and Rui can't understand why they are treated disrespectfully. Knowing that support from IARN will not last for long, Rui constantly worries about having to look after his mother and sister. He skips school and works on the night shift with a group of other retornados, looking after the packing cases of returnees at Lisbon's docks. No crates can be moved until the owners have somewhere to live. Eventually his father arrives, unwilling to talk about the torture he obviously suffered.

== Reviews ==
Writing in the Expresso, Pedro Mexia considered that "Cardoso finds the right register in every scene, emotional and dry, sad and proud, full of guilt and uncertainty. It is this visibly lived story, without demagoguery or erasures, that makes The Return a long-awaited novel. Writing in The Guardian, Oliver Balch considered that the book had been written in poetic and prescient prose, with Cardoso drawing on her own experience to capture the plight of Portugal's retornados. Although there are several non-fiction books on the topic, Taylor considered that Cardoso's rendering of the lives of the returnees made one wish that she had written a sequel, charting their experiences after they left the hotel following withdrawal of IARN support in 1976. She felt that Cardoso brought home to many the reality of this difficult time in Portugal's history. Gould considers that the book provided a "narrative of decolonization 'from below' by focusing on the lives of ordinary, non-elite white men and women during a period of political and social unrest. Goldsmith wrote that the reader was "amazed by the book's perfect harmony of innovative style, profound substance and exquisite translation". Another review found the narrator, Rui, to be difficult to "empathise with, notwithstanding the struggles he has to face", but that didn't make the book less engaging.

== Awards ==
The Return won the Critics Special Prize at the LER/Booktailors Awards 2011, held in February 2012. The book was also a winner of the 2016 English PEN Translates award, for the translation by Angel Gurría-Quintana. It was Cardoso's first book to be translated into English.
