= Amor de Perdição (TV series) =

- Also known as: Amor de Perdición
- Genre: Telenovela
- Country of origin: Brazil
- Original language: Portuguese

Original release
- Network: TV Cultura
- Release: September 6 – December 5, 1965

Amor de Perdição is a Brazilian telenovela that first aired on TV Cultura in 1965. It is based on the novel of the same name by Portuguese writer Camilo Castelo Branco.
