= The Fall of an Angel =

1866 novel by Camilo Castelo Branco

- Author: Camilo Castelo Branco
- Original title: A Queda dum Anjo
- Translator: Samuel Dennis Proctor Clough
- Language: Portuguese
- Publisher: Livraria de Campos Junior
- Publication date: 1866
- Publication place: Portugal
- English publication date: 1991
- Pages: 268

The Fall of an Angel (Portuguese: A Queda dum Anjo) is an 1866 novel by the Portuguese writer Camilo Castelo Branco. It portrays a nobleman from the countryside who is elected to the parliament in Lisbon, where he changes his loyalties, views, appearance and personal life as he becomes integrated in the city's corrupt political life. The book combines humour and criticism as it addresses themes of urban society and disappearing rural virtues.

The book became a classic in Portugal and has remained a reference point in the country's political discourse. An English translation by Samuel Dennis Proctor Clough was published in 1991.
