= Públia Hortênsia de Castro =

Portuguese philosopher

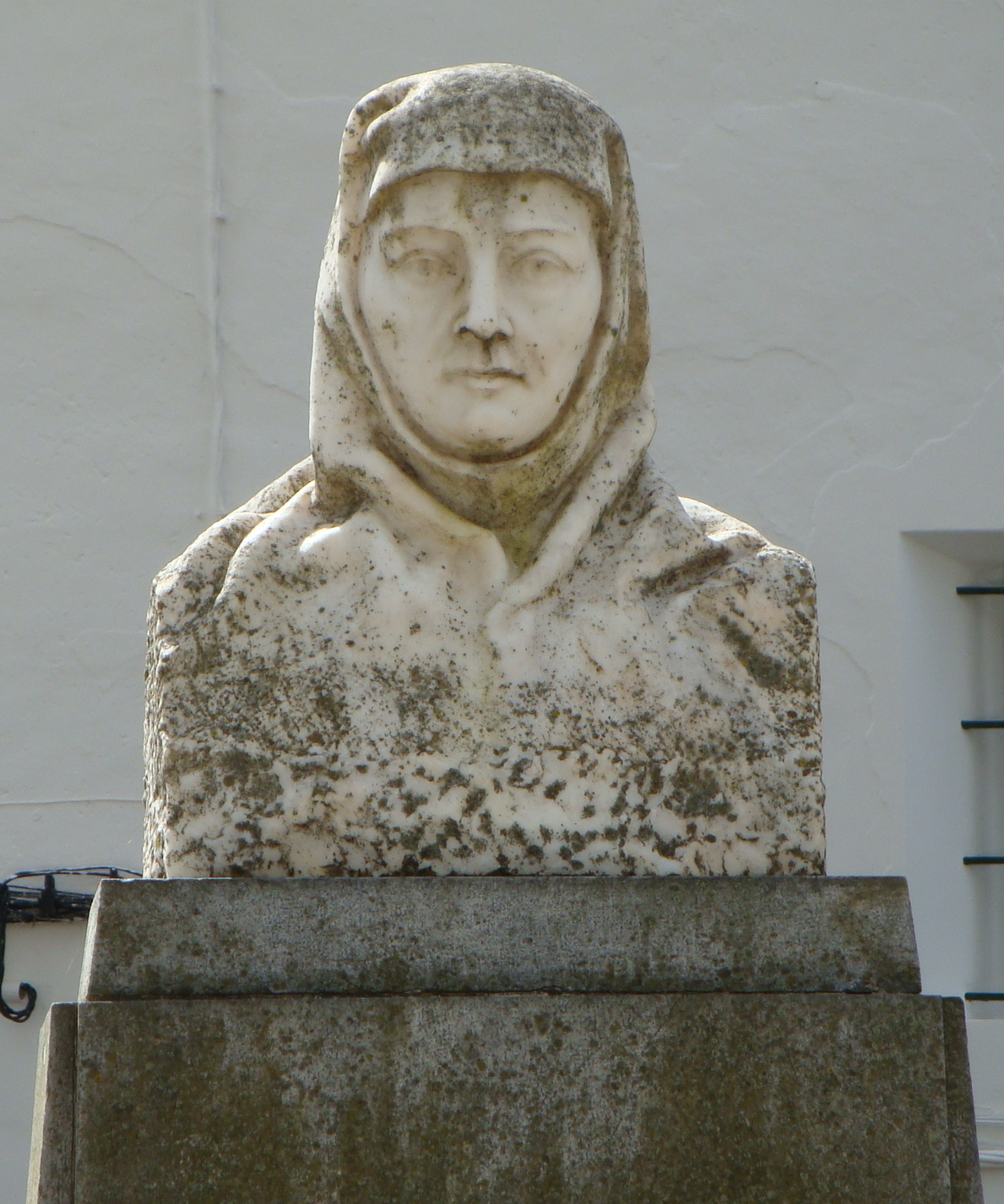
Bust of Publia Hortênsia de Castro in Vila Viçosa

Públia Hortênsia de Castro (1548–1595) was a scholar and humanist in the court of Catherine of Austria, Queen of Portugal.

== Early life ==
Born in 1548 in Vila Viçosa, Portugal, she was named for Hortensia, the famous Roman orator and daughter of Quintus Hortensius, suggesting that her parents, who were well-connected and affluent, intended her to become a well-educated woman.

Under the protection of a relative, Archbishop D. José de Melo, she moved from Vila Viçosa to nearby Évora to study at the University of Évora. She evidently studied Greek and Latin, and by the time she was seventeen she had been awarded a doctorate and was engaged in public debates on Aristotle, impressing her professors with her reasoning ability. She is believed to have been the first woman in Europe to have been awarded a doctorate. André de Resende, her teacher, was sufficiently impressed by his disciple's skills to inform foreign scholars, with whom he exchanged correspondence about her, arousing curiosity among distinguished academics. There are stories that, dressed as a boy and chaperoned by her brother who was a student there, she also attended the University of Coimbra, at the time the leading university in Portugal, but historians consider this unlikely. Nonetheless, she is known to have composed psalms in Latin, although they are now lost, and she was well enough admired by King Philip II that he granted her a pension for life.

== Later life ==
In 1574, she began to frequent the Royal Palace of Évora and the intellectual circle of Catherine of Austria, Queen of Portugal and the infanta Maria, Duchess of Viseu, that also included Joana Vaz, Paula Vicente (daughter of the playwright Gil Vicente), and Luisa Sigea de Velasco. In 1581, finding herself abandoned by those who had protected her until then, Isabel of Braganza having died in 1576, she entered the Augustine Convent of Menino Jesus da Graça in Évora, receiving an allowance to live there from Philip II of Spain, who was also the King of Portugal. This was the same allowance as that given in 1572 to Luís de Camões, author of the epic poem Os Lusíadas.

== Death ==
She died in the convent in 1595.

== Tributes ==
In 1978, Lisbon honoured De Castro by giving her name to a street in the area of Carnide., one of several roads named after her in Portugal. A Secondary School bears her name in Vila Viçosa.
