= Ana de Sousa Baptista =

Portuguese poet and writer

Ana de Sousa Baptista (born 7 March 1971 in Quarteira, Loulé) is a Portuguese writer.

== Books ==
- 2006 – Fragmentos – Livro I, Intensidez, work of 365 poetic fragmentary texts, in Portuguese, Portugal.

== Literary notebooks ==
- 2012 – La Gata Literata, Recopilación, Count Bruga Nº 1, Huelva – Espanha.
- 2012 – Pena Ventosa, poetry books for bibliophiles and collectors, 100 copies without commercial distribution, edited by José Antonio Queiroz and Henrique Monteiro, in Portuguese, Portugal.

== Anthologies ==
- 2016 – Alquimia de la Sal, poetry anthology organized by the author Santiago Aguaded Landero, Amargord Ediciones, in Spanish, Spain.
- 2012 – Alquimia del Agua, poetry anthology organized by the authors Santiago Aguaded Landero, Jack Landes e Sara Schnabel, in Spanish, Spain.
- 2010 – Divina Música, poetry anthology of music, a commemorative edition of the 25th Anniversary of Viseu Music Conservatory, organized by the poet Amadeu Baptista, Viseu Music Conservatory, Viseu – Portugal.
- 2009 – Os Dias do Amor, 365 love poems written by 365 poets of all times and all places. 365 voices that rise in 365 poems of love in all forms, in different countries, one for each day of the year, Editora Ministério dos Livros, Lisboa – Portugal.
- 2006 – Poema Poema, Portuguese poetry anthology Contemporary, poetry magazine Aullido This volume has bilingual poems of 17 poets Portuguese, translation by Eva Lacasta Alegre, Edita, Punta Umbría – Huelva – Spain.
- 2004 – Na Voragem dos Dias, Compiled by Manuel Neves, Aida Fazendeiro e Nuno Travanca, Portugal.
