= Luisa Sigea de Velasco =

Spanish poet

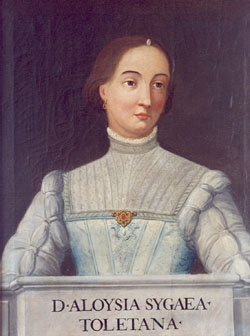
- Oil portrait of Luisa Sigea de Velasco, a Spanish humanist
- Born: 1522; Tarancón, Province of Cuenca, Castilla-La Mancha
- Died: October 13, 1560 (aged 37–38); Burgos, Spain
- Occupations: Poet, classicist and intellectual
- Writing career
- Movement: Humanism

Luisa Sigea de Velasco (c. 1522 in Tarancón – October 13, 1560 in Burgos), also known as Luisa Sigeia, Luisa Sigea Toledana and in the Latinized form Aloysia Sygaea Toletana, was a poet and intellectual, one of the major figures of Spanish humanism. She spent a good part of her life at the Portuguese court in the service of Maria of Portugal (1521–1577), as her lady-in-waiting and Latin teacher.

== Early years ==
Luisa Sigea de Velasco was born c. 1522 in Tarancón, the fourth and youngest child of the Spanish noblewoman, Francisca Velasco, and Diogo Sigeo, a Frenchman. (Note: The year of Sigea's birth is disputed but compelling research by Léon Bourdon and Odette Sauvage (1970) supports 1522. Sofia Frade (2016) asserts that Sigea was born before her father fled from Castile in 1522, perhaps in 1520. Kaminsky (ed.) writes that she was born between 1526 and 1530.) She had a sister, Ângela, and two brothers, Diogo and António. Her father had moved to Spain as a child and was educated at University of Alcalá, where he learnt Latin, Ancient Greek and Hebrew. After participating in the failed Revolt of the Comuneros led by Juan López de Padilla, Diogo fled to Portugal in 1522 and began serving as tutor to the children of the Duke of Braganza. He brought his family to join him in Portugal around 1536.

After moving to Portugal, Luisa was educated by her father, alongside the rest of her siblings. They were taught Greek, Latin, grammar, rhetoric, and music. The education that the Sigea girls received was incredibly unique; learning opportunities were rarely afforded to other contemporary women, and almost never outside a monastic context.

== Court of Maria of Portugal ==
In 1542, the Sigea sisters were invited by Catherine of Austria to become ladies-in-waiting at the Portuguese court. Luisa soon began teaching Latin to Infanta Maria. The daughter of Manuel I and Eleanor of Austria, Maria inherited an enormous fortune and was a famed patron of the arts. She fostered an intellectual circle at court that welcomed female scholars and granted them the unique opportunity to be compensated for their services. Luisa was the highest paid of Maria's chamber ladies, receiving an impressive salary of 16,000 reis a year. (Note: In comparison, Joana Vaz taught Latin and received a salary of just 10,000 reis.)

=== Literary works ===
Luisa wrote her most famous literary works during her time at the court of Maria of Portugal, namely Syntra, a Latin poem dedicated to the Infanta, and Duarum Virginum Colloquium de vita aulica et privata (Dialogue between two Virgins on Court Life and Private Life), a bucolic dialogue. She was also active in the philosophical discourse of her age, exchanging letters with a number of key figures of contemporary European politics. Her letters paint a rich picture of her intellectual life and clearly display her proficiency as a humanist writer. They contain an abundance of Classics references, serving as a useful source on what classical texts were available in Portugal at the time.

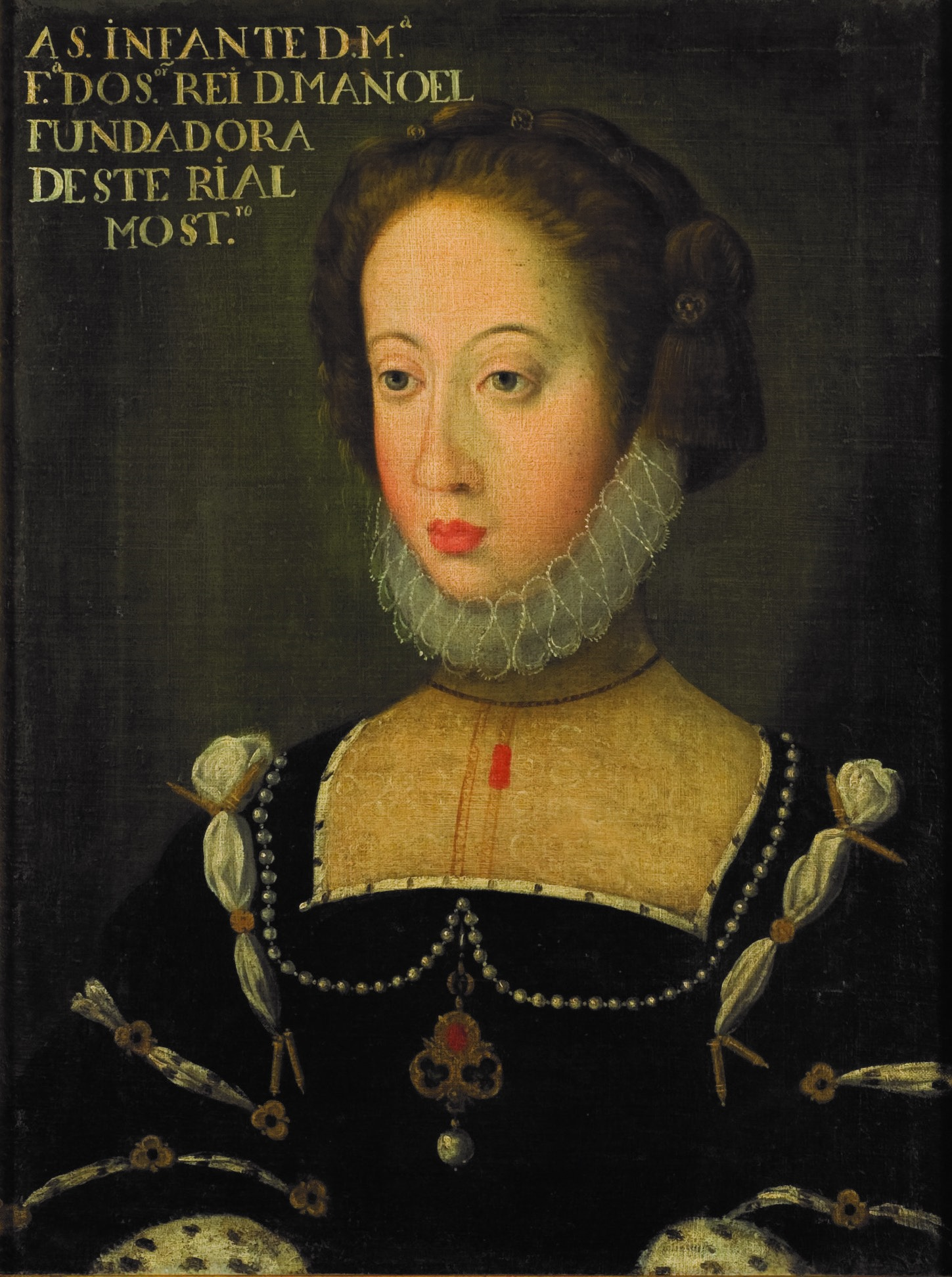
Portrait of Maria, Duchess of Viseu, Luisa's tutee and patron. c. 1540s

In a letter penned to Pope Paul III in 1546, Luisa demonstrated mastery of Greek, Latin, Hebrew, Arabic, and Syriac. (Note: Luisa wrote the letter in Latin and attached her translations in the four other languages.) The Pope responded in January 1547 expressing admiration for Luisa's talents, writing "...we give thanks to Almighty God who has bestowed this precious gift of the knowledge of many languages, a talent that is rare among men, but rarer still among women.” The correspondence earned Luisa international recognition as a learned woman, evidenced by praise in a 1553 French publication by Guillaume Postel.

Luisa also presented Paul III with her poem Syntra. The name refers to the forest of Sintra, near Lisbon. Written in the context of the negotiation of Maria's marriage to Philip II of Spain, the poem tells the story of a nymph prophesying the Infanta's marriage to a powerful man who will rule the world. The work contains learned allusions to Ovid, Virgil and Homer, with some also suggesting connections to the works of female classical poets, Sappho and Sulpicia. Syntra improved Luisa's reputation at court.

In 1552, Luisa composed Duarum Virginum Colloquium de vita aulica et privata, a dialogue between two women on whether it is better to live at court or in a private home, a well-trodden humanism theme. In her dedication, Luisa thanks Maria for giving her the time and space to work, acknowledging the unique position she finds herself in as a member of the Infanta's court.

== Later life ==
In 1552, Luisa married Francisco de Cuevas, a poor nobleman from Burgos, Spain. Shortly after this, she moved to Burgos and the couple had one daughter, Juana de Cuevas Sigea. Around 1556, Luisa and her husband found work at the court of Mary of Hungary, the sister of Emperor Charles V. Francisco worked as a secretary and Luisa as a Latinist, but the post was short-lived, as Queen Mary died in 1558. Luisa spent the rest of her life trying to gain another position at court, unsuccessfully petitioning King Philip II and his wife Elisabeth of Valois. She died in Burgos on 13 October 1560.

== Legacy ==
Duarum Virginum Colloquium de vita aulica et privata was published in France in 1562 by Jean Nicot, a friend of Sigea's father. Although its immediate reception was positive, the dialogue then fell into comparative obscurity until the early twentieth century. Syntra was printed in 1566 in Paris. The publication of Sigea's works was the result of concentrated efforts by her father, Diogo, to conserve and profit from her memory and fame. She is the only woman to have published works in Latin in the 16th century.

Described by one Toledan nobleman as "Minerva of her time", Sigea's eminence persisted throughout the 16th century and she was the subject of numerous elegies in the decades after her death. André de Resende wrote the following epitaph for Sigea: Hic sita SIGAEA est: satis hoc: qui cetera nescit | Rusticus est: artes nec colit ille bonas (loosely translated: 'Here lies Sigea. These words suffice. Anyone who does not know the rest is a bumpkin and does not concern himself with culture'). Similarly, poet Pedro Laínez penned a lengthy lament that culminates with the lines: “Here lies the most famous Sigea, in rare perfection, esteemed without equal in a world girded by the sea and surrounded by the sun, stolen by Death before her time.”

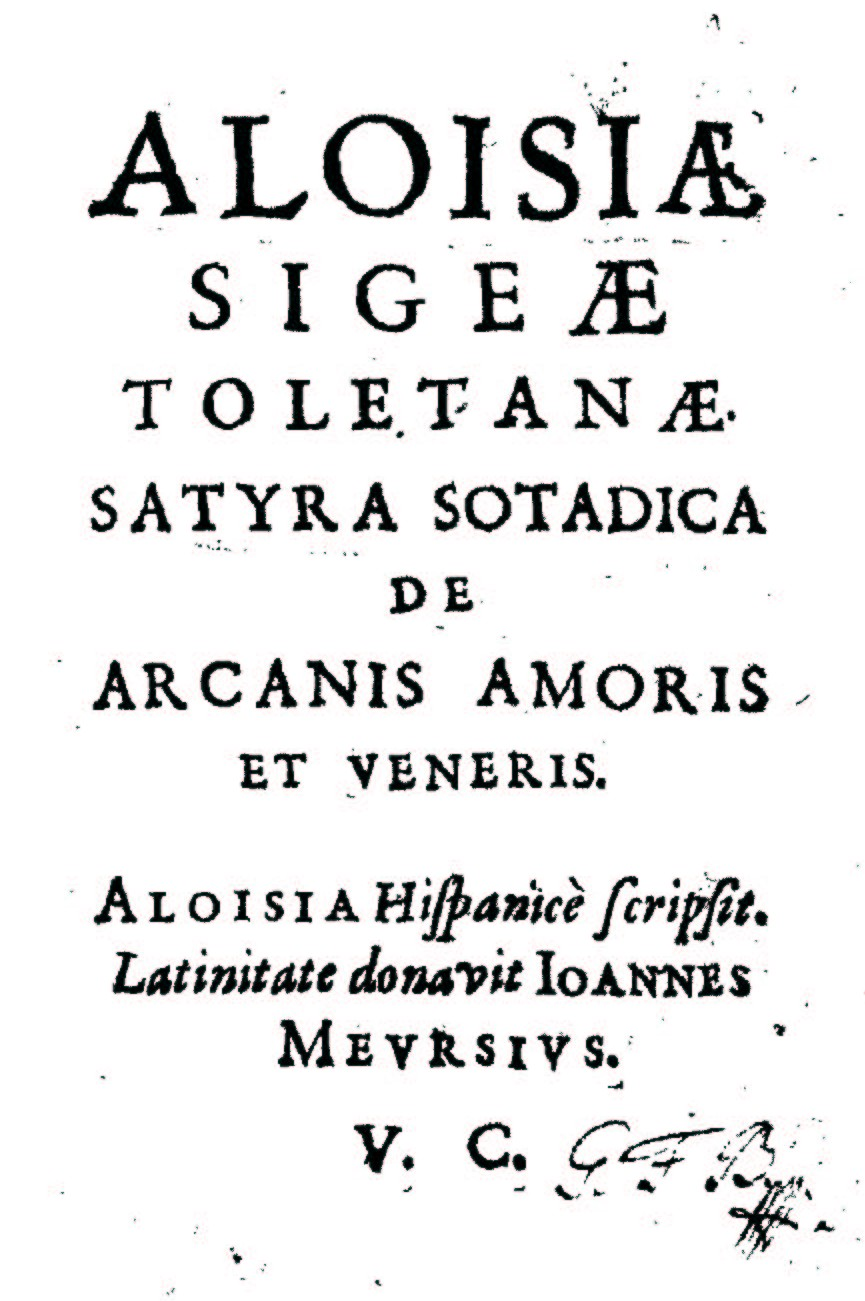
Cover page of the original 1660 publication falsely attributed to Sigea.

=== Satyra Sotadica – the hoax ===
In 1660, an erotic work titled Luisa Sigea Toledana's Sotadic satire, on the secrets of love and sex; Luisa wrote it in Spanish; it has here been translated into Latin by J. Meursius (Aloysiæ Sigeæ Toletanæ satyra sotadica de arcanis amoris et veneris: Aloysia hispanice scripsit: latinitate donavit J. Meursius) was published. Better known as Satyra Sotadica, the manuscript is one of the most famous early modern pornographic works. Particularly provocative for scenes of lesbian intercourse, the text tells the story of an older woman teaching a young woman about sex. The attribution to Sigea was a hoax; the true author was the Frenchman Nicolas Chorier. The work was translated into many other languages, including English, under the title Dialogues of Luisa Sigea.
