= Francisca Clotilde =

Brazilian writer (1862–1935)

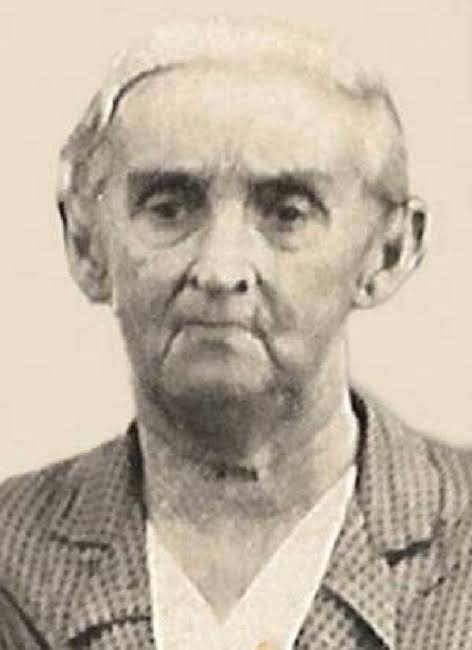
- Born: 19 October 1862; Tauá, Brazil
- Died: 8 December 1935 (aged 73); Fortaleza, Brazil

Francisca Clotilde (19 October 1862 – 8 December 1935) was a Brazilian writer. She was an advocate for women's rights and an abolitionist. Her most noted work was The Divorced Woman in 1902 and the literary magazine A Estella.

== Life ==
Clotilde was born in 1862 in Tauá in north eastern Brazil. Her parents were João Correia Lima and Ana Maria Castelo Branco. She was an abolitionist, and known as an advocate for women's rights. She worked as a translator, and she published short stories, poems and articles under the pseudonym Jane Davy. She wrote articles for the fortnightly A Quinzena and several newspapers at a time when writing was unusual. She was the first women to teach at the Normal School in Fortaleza from 1884. She lost that job because of her opinions. However she then opened her own day school where she continued her teaching.

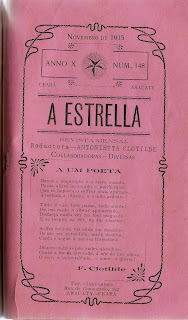
A Estrella issue of Nov 1915

She and her two daughters founded the Externato Santa Clotilde on 15 January 1891.

Her most noted single work was The Divorced Woman which was a controversial book when it was published in 1902. She inspired the creation of a literary magazine titled "A Estrella" and it was first published in Baturité on 28 October 1906. It was said to be a part of a blossoming of intellectual activity in the state of Ceará. It was edited by her daughter Antonieta Clothilde and Carmem Taumaturg and over the next fifteen years it included contributions from over one hundred writers. It was last published in 1921 in Aracati.

Clotilde died in Fortaleza in 1935. Her daughters were involved in her work. In 2007 Anamélia Custódio Mota published a book,Francisca Clotilde: A pioneer of Education and Literature in Ceará, about the life and work of Clotilde.
