= Eleanor of Austria =

Queen of Portugal (1518–1521) and France (1530–1547)

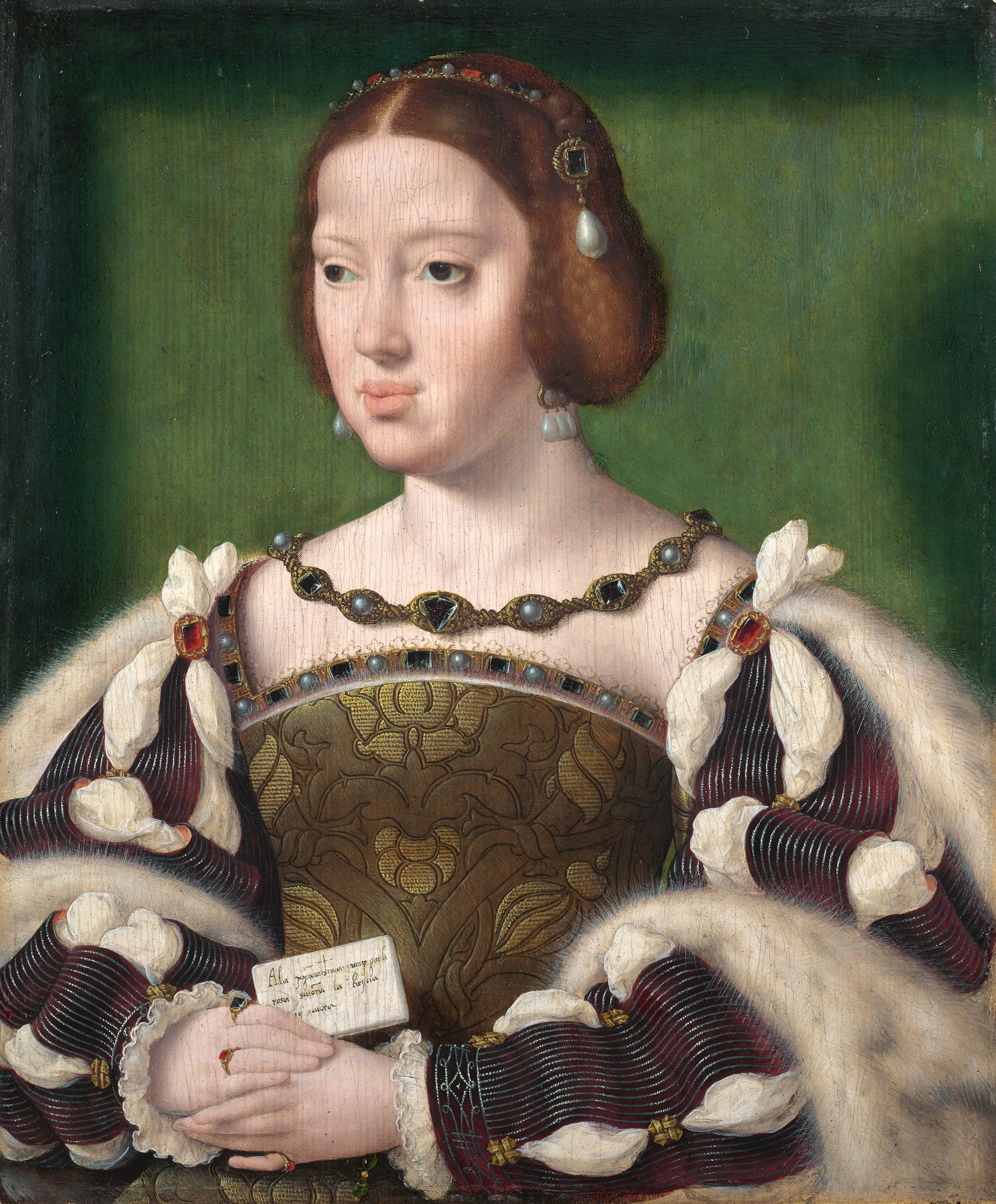
- Portrait by Joos van Cleve, c. 1530

Queen consort of Portugal
- Tenure: 16 July 1518 – 13 December 1521

Queen consort of France
- Tenure: 4 July 1530 – 31 March 1547
- Coronation: 31 May 1531
- Born: 15 November 1498; Leuven, Duchy of Brabant, Holy Roman Empire
- Died: 25 February 1558 (aged 59); Talavera la Real, Crown of Castile
- Burial: Lleida, then El Escorial
- Spouses: Manuel I of Portugal (m. 1518; died 1521) Francis I of France (m. 1530; died 1547)
- Issue more...: Infante Charles; Maria, Duchess of Viseu
- House: Habsburg
- Father: Philip the Handsome
- Mother: Joanna of Castile

Eleanor of Austria (15 November 1498 – 25 February 1558), also called Eleanor of Castile, was Queen of Portugal from 1518 to 1521 as the wife of King Manuel I and Queen of France from 1530 to 1547 as the wife of King Francis I. She also held the Duchy of Touraine (1547–1558) in dower. She is called "Leonor" in Spanish and Portuguese and "Éléonore" or "Aliénor" in French. She was the eldest child of Duke Philip of Burgundy and Queen Joanna of Castile, and the elder sister of Holy Roman Emperor Charles V, and her life was dominated by her role in the international dynastic politics of the period.

== Life ==
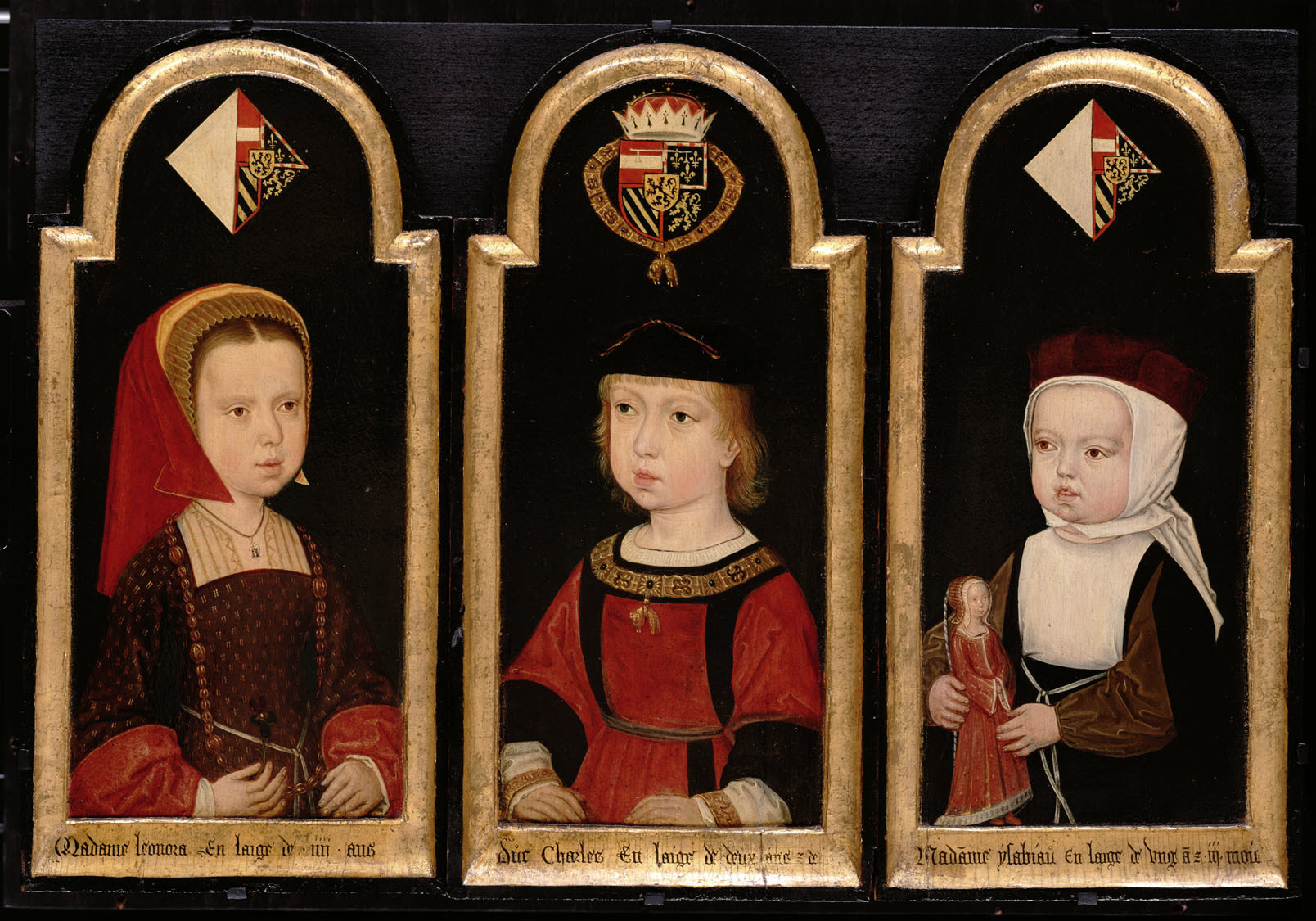
Eleanor and her siblings

Eleanor was born in 1498 at Leuven, the eldest child of Philip of Austria and Joanna of Castile, later king and queen of Castile. Her father was the son of Holy Roman Emperor Maximilian I and Duchess Mary of Burgundy, while her mother was the daughter of King Ferdinand II of Aragon and Queen Isabella I of Castile. Her siblings were Holy Roman Emperors Charles V and Ferdinand I and Queens Isabella of Denmark, Mary of Hungary, and Catherine of Portugal. She was named after her paternal great-grandmother, Eleanor of Portugal, Holy Roman Empress. After the death of her father in September 1506 Eleanor was educated at the court of her aunt Margaret of Austria in Mechelen (in modern Belgium).

When she was a child, Eleanor's relatives tried to marry her to the future Henry VIII of England, who was seven years her senior. However, when his father died and he became king, Henry decided to marry Eleanor's aunt Catherine of Aragon, who was the widow of Henry's older brother, Arthur, Prince of Wales. Her relatives also tried to marry her to the French kings Louis XII or Francis I or to Sigismund I of Poland but nothing came of these plans. Eleanor was also proposed as a marriage candidate for Antoine, Duke of Lorraine, in 1510.

In 1517 Eleanor may have had a love affair with Frederick II, Elector Palatine. Her brother Charles, who had succeeded their grandfather Ferdinand II as King of Aragon the year before, once discovered her reading a love letter from Frederick. Charles forced Eleanor and Frederick to swear in front of a lawyer that they were not secretly married, after which he expelled Frederick from court. She followed her brother to Spain in 1517.

=== Queen of Portugal ===
Eleanor married her uncle, King Manuel I of Portugal, after a proposed marriage with his son and her cousin, John, did not occur. Her brother Charles arranged the marriage between Eleanor and Manuel to avoid the possibility of Portuguese assistance for any rebellion in Castile. Manuel had previously been married to two of Eleanor's maternal aunts, Isabella of Aragon and Maria of Aragon.

Manuel and Eleanor married on 16 July 1518. They had two children: the Infante Charles (born 18 February 1520 – died 15 April 1521) and the Infanta Maria (born 18 June 1521, who was later one of the richest princesses of Europe). Eleanor became a widow on 13 December 1521, when Manuel died of the plague. As queen dowager, Eleanor returned to her brother's court in Spain. Eleanor's sister Catherine later married Eleanor's stepson, John III of Portugal.

In July 1523, Eleanor was engaged to Charles III, Duke of Bourbon, in an alliance between Charles and Bourbon against France, but the marriage never took place. In 1526, Eleanor was engaged to King Francis I of France during his captivity in Spain.

=== Queen of France ===
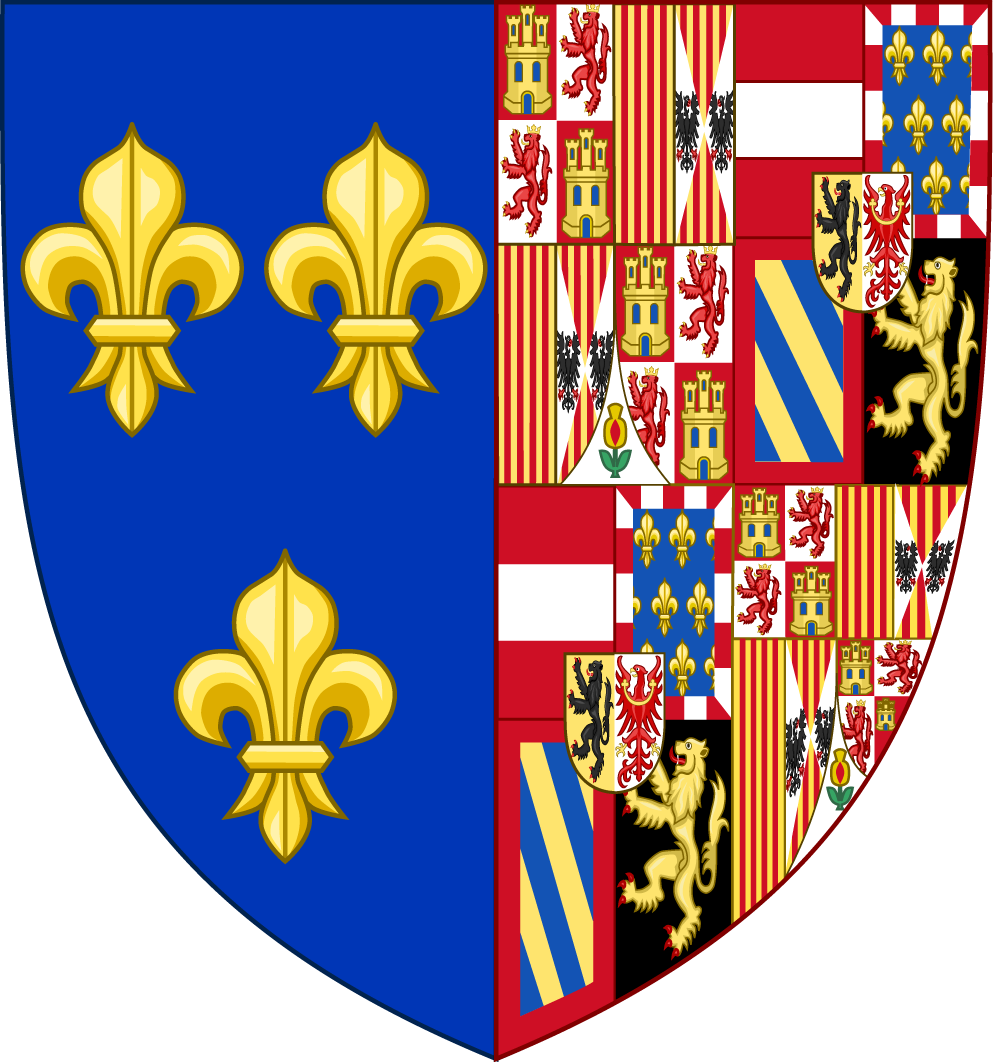
Eleanor of Austria's coat of arms as queen of France

The Treaty of Cambrai (1529; called La Paz de las Damas - "The Ladies' Peace") paused the conflict between Francis and Charles. It included the stipulation that the previously agreed upon marriage of Eleanor and Francis would take place.

Eleanor left Spain in the company of her future stepsons, who had been held hostage by her brother. The group met Francis at the border, and then departed for an official entrance to Bordeaux. She was married to Francis on 4 July 1530. Eleanor was crowned Queen of France at the Basilica of Saint-Denis on 31 May 1531. She was dressed in purple velvet at her coronation. They had no children.

Eleanor was ignored by Francis, who seldom performed his marital obligations and preferred his lover Anne de Pisseleu d'Heilly. At the official entrance of Eleanor to Paris, Francis displayed himself openly to the public in a window with Anne for two hours.

Queen Eleanor performed as the queen of France at official occasions, such as the wedding between her stepson Henry and Catherine de' Medici in 1533. She also performed charity and was praised for this. She also took her stepdaughters, Madeleine and Margaret, into her household to raise them further.

As queen, Eleanor had no political power; however, she served as a contact between France and Emperor Charles. Queen Eleanor was present at the peace negotiations between Francis and Charles in Aigues-Mortes in 1538. In 1544, she was given the task of entering peace negotiations with Charles and their sister Mary of Hungary. In November 1544, she visited Charles in Brussels.

=== Later life ===
As a queen dowager, Eleanor left France for Brussels in 1548. She witnessed the abdication of Charles in October 1555 and left for Spain with him and their sister Mary in August 1556. She lived with her sister in Jarandilla de la Vera, where they often visited their brother, who retired to the Monastery of Yuste nearby. In 1558, she met her daughter Maria in Badajoz for the first time in 28 years. Eleanor became ill while returning from Badajoz. Eleanor died on 25 February 1558, on the return trip from Badajoz. Her brother was devastated to learn of her death and he himself died seven months later.

== Family ==
With Manuel I of Portugal:

- Infante Charles (18 February 1520 – 15 April 1521); died in infancy.
- Infanta Maria, Duchess of Viseu (8 June 1521 – 10 October 1577); never married and did not have issue.

== Ancestry ==
Ancestors of Eleanor of Austria

8. Frederick III, Holy Roman Emperor
4. Maximilian I, Holy Roman Emperor
9. Eleanor of Portugal
2. Philip I of Castile
10. Charles I, Duke of Burgundy
5. Mary, Duchess of Burgundy
11. Isabella of Bourbon
1. Eleanor of Austria
12. John II of Aragon
6. Ferdinand II of Aragon
13. Juana Enriquez
3. Joanna I of Castile
14. John II of Castile
7. Isabella I of Castile
15. Isabella of Portugal

Eleanor of Austria House of Habsburg Born: 15 November 1498 Died: 25 February 1558
Royal titles
| Vacant Title last held by Maria of Aragon | Queen consort of Portugal; 16 July 1516 – 13 December 1521 | Vacant Title next held by Catherine of Austria |
| Vacant Title last held by Claude of France | Queen consort of France; 4 July 1530 – 31 March 1547 | Vacant Title next held by Catherine de' Medici |
