= António Cabral =

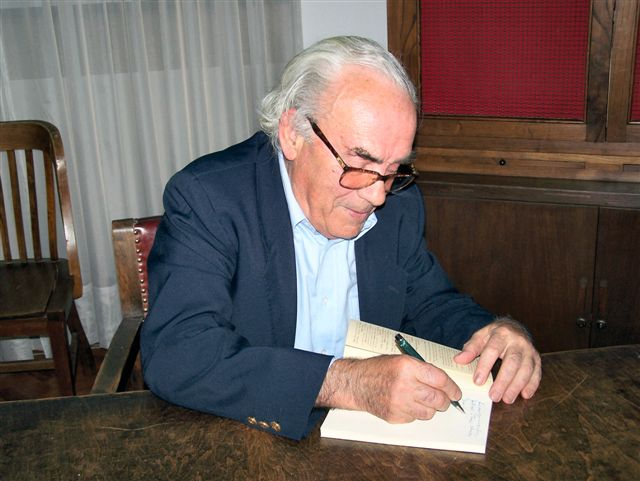
- António Cabral (2007)
- Born: April 30, 1931; Castedo do Douro, Alijó, Portugal
- Died: October 23, 2007 (aged 76); Vila Real, Portugal
- Resting place: Castedo do Douro, Alijó, Portugal
- Occupations: Poetry, Drama, Fiction, Ethnography, Ludic Theory, Essay
- Writing career
- Language: Portuguese

António Joaquim Magalhães Cabral (30 April 1931 – 23 October 2007) was a Portuguese poet, fictionist, playwright, ethnographer and essayist.

== Bibliography ==
=== Poetry ===
- 1951 - Sonhos do meu Anjo
- 1956 - O Mar e as Águias
- 1958 - Falo-vos da Montanha
- 1960 - A Flor e as Palavras (1º Prémio de Manuscritos do SNI)
- 1963 - Poemas Durienses
- 1967 - Os Homens Cantam a Nordeste
- 1971 - Quando o Silêncio Reverdece
- 1976 - A Hierarquia dos Na(ba)bos
- 1977 - Emigração Clandestina
- 1979 - Aqui, Douro
- 1983 - Entre o Azul e a Circunstância
- 1993 - Novos Poemas Durienses
- 1996 - Festa de Natal e Reis: poesia, música, teatro
- 1997 - Bodas Selvagens
- 1999 - Antologia dos Poemas Durienses
- 2000 - O Peso da Luz nas Coisas
- 2003 - Ouve-se um Rumor e Entre Quem É
- 2003 - Contos de Natal para Crianças
- 2007 - O Rio Que Perdeu as Margens
- 2007 - A Tentação de Santo Antão (posthumous publication)

=== Fiction ===
- 1983 - Festa em Setembro; Jogos Populares em Sabrosa; Pedro e Isabel
- 1990 - Memória Delta
- 1995 - A Noiva de Caná
- 2005 - O Prometeu Agrilhoado Hoje

=== Theatre ===
- 1975 - O Herói (2nd prize of Academia Teresopolitana de Letras, Teresópolis, Brasil, in 1964)
- 1977 - A Linha e o Nó
- 1977 - 7 Peças em um Acto
- 1994 - Semires
- 2005 - A Fraga das Dunas
- 2008 - A Moura Encantada

=== Ethnography ===
- 1980 - Jogos Populares Transmontanos
- 1983 - 14 Jogos Populares
- 1985 - Cancioneiro Popular Duriense
- 1986 - Jogos Populares Portugueses
- 1988 - Os Jogos Populares: Onze Anos de História: 1977-1988
- 1990 - Teatro Popular: a Criação do Mundo ou o Ramo
- 1991 - Jogos Populares Infantis
- 1993 - Adeus, Adeus, ó Castedo
- 1998 - Jogos Populares Portugueses de Jovens e Adultos
- 1991 - Jogos Populares e Provérbios da Vinha e do Vinho
- 2001 - A Cantiga e o Romance Popular no Alto Douro

=== Ludic Theory ===
- 1981 - Os Jogos Populares e o Ensino
- 1984 - A Perspetiva Cultural dos Jogos Populares
- 1990 - Teoria do Jogo
- 1992 - A Imitação e a Competição no Jogo Infantil
- 1994 - O Modelo Lúdico do Ensino-Aprendizagem
- 1999 - Tradições Populares – I
- 1999 - Tradições Populares – II
- 2001 - O Jogo no Ensino
- 2002 - O Mundo Fascinante do Jogo

=== Essay ===
==== Literature ====
- 1965 - História da Literatura Portuguesa
- 1971 - Morfologia Literária
- 1977 - Miguel Torga, o Orfeu Rebelde

== Sources ==
- Life and work of António Cabral (1931-2007) (in Portuguese)
- Projecto Vercial - António Cabral (in Portuguese)
