= Inês Botelho =

Portuguese writer (born 1986)

Inês de Albuquerque Rocha Botelho
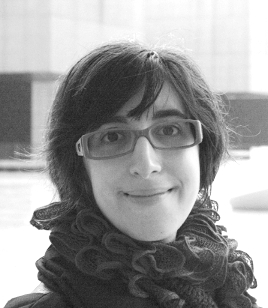
- Born: 3 August 1986 (age 38); Vila Nova de Gaia, Portugal
- Education: MA, University of Porto
- Occupations: Writer; Researcher; Content manager
- Known for: Fantasy novels
- Notable work: O Ceptro de Aerzis trilogy

Inês de Albuquerque Rocha Botelho (born 3 August 1986), is a Portuguese fiction and non-fiction writer of books and short stories, a literary critic, a historical researcher and, more recently, a marketing manager.

== Early life and education ==
Botelho was born in Vila Nova de Gaia in the Porto District of Portugal on 3 August 1986. In 2008 she graduated in biology and in 2013 she obtained a master's degree in Anglo-American Studies, with a thesis on representations of "Beauty and the Beast" in some short stories by Angela Carter. Both degrees were from the University of Porto. Botelho is also an accomplished pianist and is qualified in piano and musical training.

As a child Botelho had a passion for acting and was involved in local amateur dramatics. A voracious reader, she has cited Marion Zimmer Bradley, Michael Cunningham, Vergílio Ferreira, Natália Correia, Aldous Huxley, William Faulkner, Amos Oz, Vladimir Nabokov, Margaret Atwood, Neil Gaiman and Angela Carter as being important influences on her. She started to write her first book at the age of 15. This was published in 2002 as a novel called The Daughter of the Worlds (A Filha dos Mundos), which was considered to follow the epic fantasy genre. At that early age she already envisaged it as the first of a trilogy, to be known as The Sceptre of Aerzis (O Ceptro de Aerzis). The second book in the trilogy followed in 2004, entitled The Lady of the Night and Mists (A Senhora da Noite e das Brumas), and the third in 2005, The Queen of the Lands of Light (A Rainha das Terras da Luz).

== Career ==
Botelho's fourth book, Prelude (Prelúdio), published in 2007 represented a change in style to romantic fiction, as did her fifth, The Past That We Will Be (O passado que seremos), released in 2010, which was placed on the Portuguese National Curriculum as recommended reading for secondary schools. At this time, she was spoken of as “a refreshing name that reveals what the future of Portuguese fiction will be” and “one of the most promising young authors of new Portuguese fiction” but she has not published a book since then. She has, however, been a frequent contributor to Bang!, a magazine which is devoted to fantasy, science-fiction, and horror stories.

From 2014 to 2022 Botelho collaborated as a researcher with the Centre for English Translation and Anglo-Portuguese Studies (CETAPS), a research centre that brings together people from 11 Portuguese institutions of higher education. In 2022 she joined the Cardano Foundation, an open-source blockchain and cryptocurrency organization based in Switzerland, to work as a content marketing manager.
