= Casa Fernando Pessoa =

Cultural center in Lisbon, Portugal

Coordinates: 38.7166°N 9.1624°W

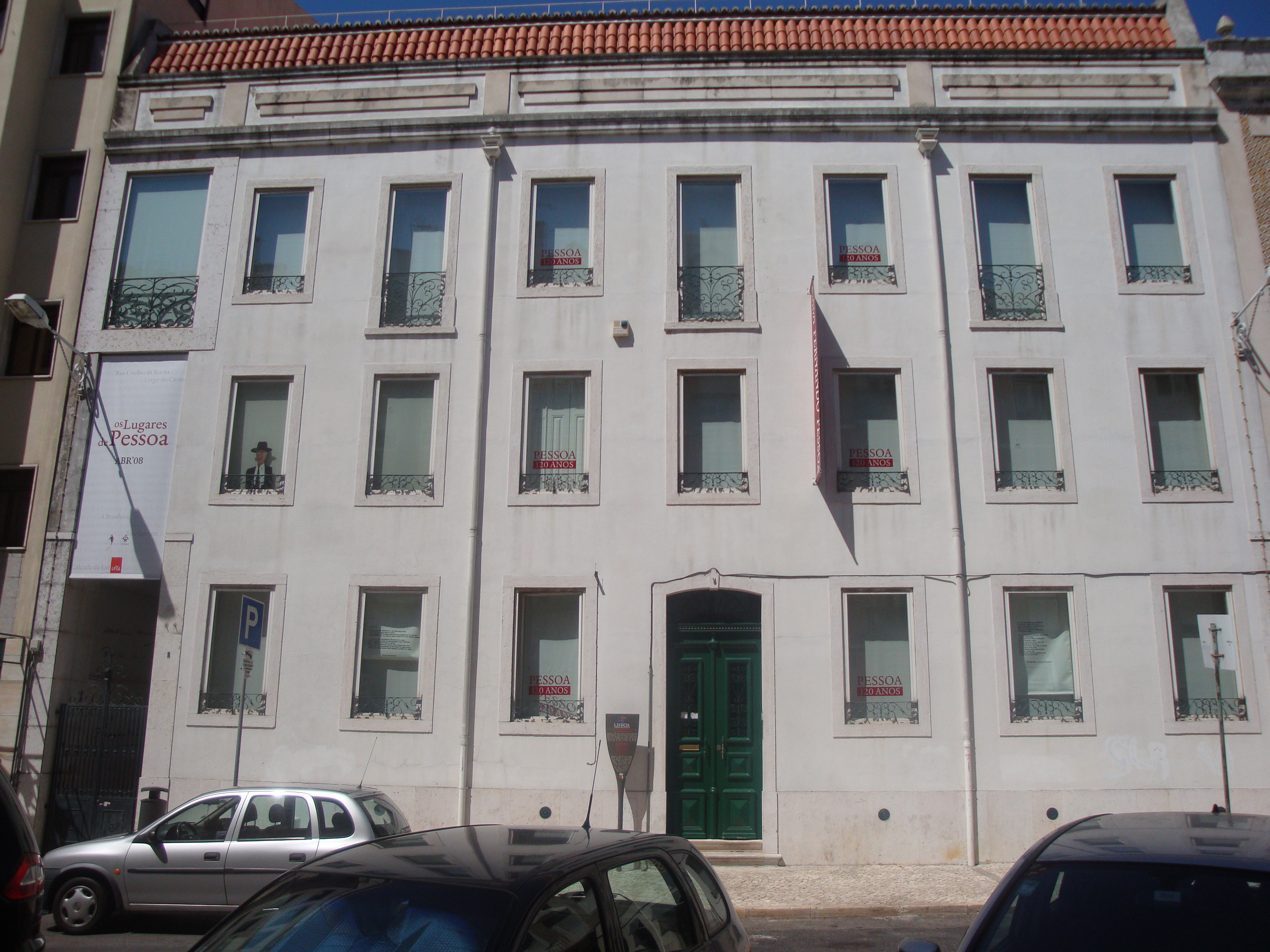
Casa Fernando Pessoa in Campo de Ourique.

Casa Fernando Pessoa (Portuguese pronunciation: [ˈkazɐ fɨɾˈnɐ̃du pɨˈsoɐ]; "Fernando Pessoa House") is a cultural center in Campo de Ourique of Lisbon, Portugal.

== History ==
It was created in honor of the poet Fernando Pessoa, and conceived as a "home of poetry". It is located in the building where Pessoa lived between 1920 and 1935.

The cultural center opened on 30 November 1993. It was made a national treasure in 2009.
