= José Riço Direitinho =

Portuguese writer and literary critic

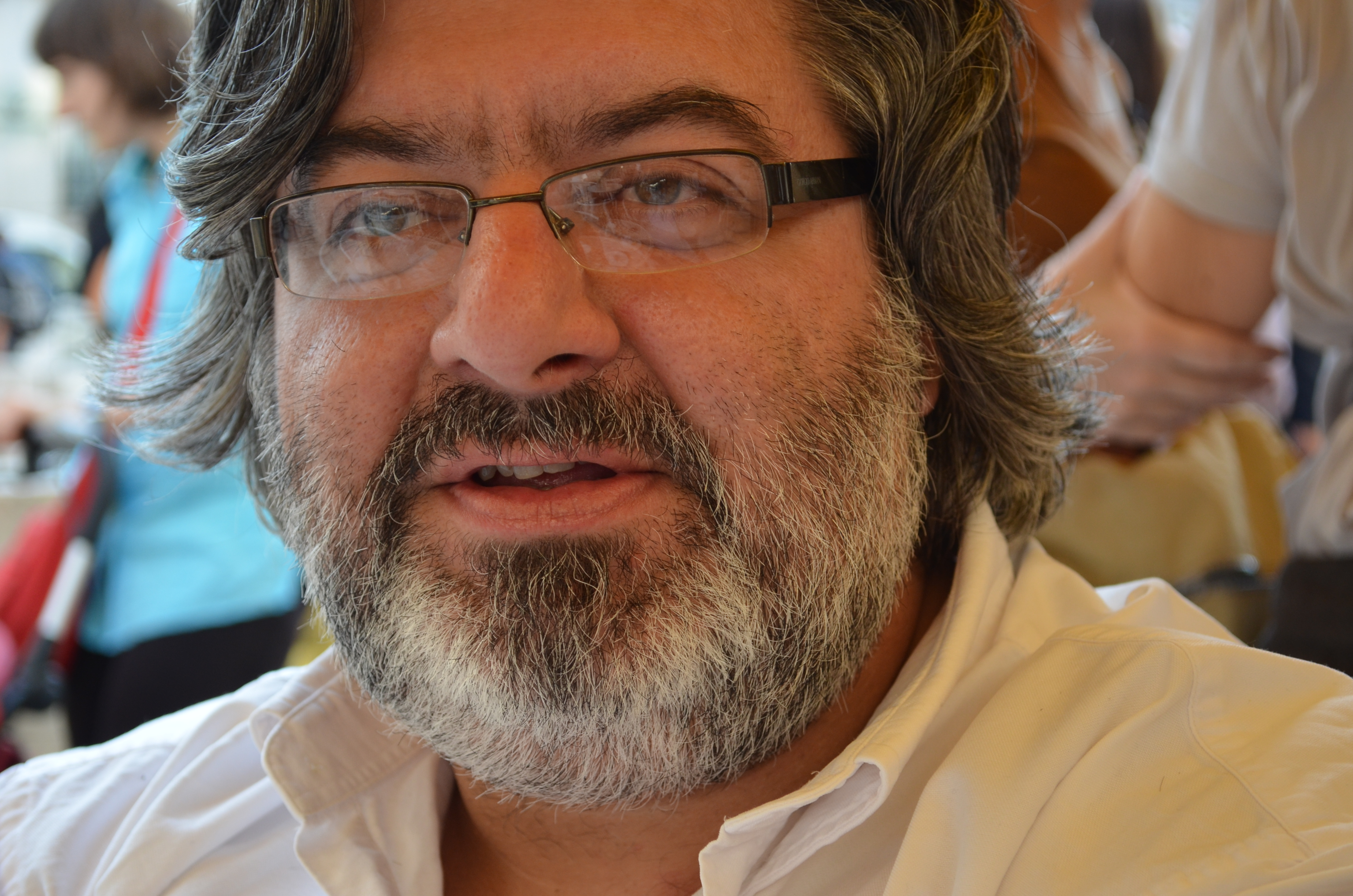

José Riço Direitinho (born 1965 in Lisbon) is a Portuguese writer and literary critic. He is graduated in Agronomy. He earned a place in Portuguese literature with his nostalgic and visceral style.

He first wrote for the literary supplement of the Diário de Notícias, of Lisbon, from 1985 to 1991. His literary debut came with the short stories book A Casa do Fim (The House of the End) in 1992, which was critically acclaimed. He then published two novels, Breviário das Más Inclinações (1994), who won the Ramón Goméz de la Serna Prize, and Relógio do Cárcere (1997), who won the Villa de Madrid Prize. He lived in Berlin, Germany, from 1999 to 2000, and his travels inspired him to write Histórias com Cidades (2001). He lived in the Ledig House, in New York City, in 2004, where he started his short stories book Um Sorriso Inesperado, published in 2005. He is also a literary critic for the daily newspaper Público, of Lisbon.

His stories deal with a rural imaginary, reflecting the influences of writers like Miguel Torga, Aquilino Ribeiro and Camilo José Cela. He was hailed by José Saramago as one of the most important Portuguese writers of his generation.

== Works ==
- A casa do fim, 1992
- Breviário das más inclinações, 1994
- Relógio do cárcere, 1997
- Histórias com cidades, 2001
- Um sorriso inesperado, 2005
