= Violante do Céu =

Sor Violante do Céu or do Ceo (or in Spanish Violante del Cielo) was a woman poet from the Iberian Peninsula. While the year of her birth is under much debate, Violante do Céu ("of Heaven" in Portuguese), was born in Lisbon, Portugal on May 30, 1601, or 1607 to Manoel da Sylveira Montesino(s) and Helena da França de Ávila (Machado 775).

== Biography ==
She entered the convent of Nossa Senhora da Rosa da Ordem do Grande Patriarca Santo Domingos on August 29, 1630, and lived and worked there until her death on January 28, 1693 (Machado 775).

Sor Violante possessed a natural gift for poetry and began writing as an adolescent. She wrote her first known work La Transformación por Dios at the age of twelve (Machado) and continued to write in her distinct baroque, lyrical poetry after she entered the convent. Yet, her entrance in the convent did not affect the direction of her literary work, as she continued writing romantic and even erotic poetry (Mendes 13). Moreover, after entering the convent, Sor Violante continued to interact with members of the upper class and maintained an awareness her more worldly surroundings as another theme found in her poetry includes the important political occurrences of her time. This interaction also manifests itself in the fact that tertulias, or poetry gatherings, and certamens, or poetry contests, often took place, for these poetic gatherings not only involved nuns but also noble members of Lisbon society (Pociña 13).

== Literary works ==
- Rimas varias de la Madre Soror Violante del Cielo, religiosa en el monasterio de la Rosa de Lisboa (published in Rouen France, 1646)
- Romance a Christo Crucificado (1659)
- Soliloquio ao SS. Sacramento (1662)
- Soliloquios para antes, e depois da Comunhao (1668)
- Meditacoens da Missa, e preparacoens affectuosas de huma alma devote e agradecida a vistas das finezas do Amor Divino contempladas no Acro-santo sacrificio da Missa, e memoria da sagrada Paiza de Christo Senhor nosso, com estimulos para o Amor Divino (1689)
- Parnaso Lusitano (collection of poems published posthumously in French, Spanish, Portuguese, and Latin; 1733)

== Selected themes ==
Rimas Varias, the first theme the reader encounters is the evocation of traditional suffering of male poets immortalizing female beloved objects.

Ay decreto cruel del bien que adoro
que poseyendo tú, me des la muerte
y que escribiendo yo, te dé la vida

Sor Violante employs a sapphic style in that both grieving speaker and deceased addressee are women. In other works found in Rimas varias, Sor Violante do Ceu writes poetic verses about the trials living-in-love and the idea of swooning courtship. The elements she utilizes in these works use a vocabulary of lyrical love that is both idealized and erotic.

Sor Violante do Ceu introduces the humor of self-parody and gender play that become more explicit, as found in her poetic romance, "Amada prenda del alma" (Rimas varias). In this work, she presents an all-female love triangle that implicitly pokes fun at the inevitability of heterosexual possessiveness. The woman, the desired object of exchange, moves not between men, but from woman speaker to woman addressee. In these poems, the extremes are not of hierarchical gender positions, as found with heterosexual love, but feeling. The poet casts before us the egocentrism of male possession of women, and at the same time, she demonstrates a compelling, erotic intimacy between women.

Another theme common to Sor Violante's works is religious mysticism, which is also common to other writers of her time such as Teresa of Avila, another Spanish mystics. Sor Violante's religious poetry exhibits a distinctly feminine voice and a predilection for Nativity themes. For example, Al Nacimiento en la Misa (To the Nativity in Mass) exemplifies the correlation between the incarnation motifs, the corporality of divinity, in both the Nativity and the Mass. Moreover, some of Sor Violante do Ceu's poetry contrasts human and divine love, as when she compares the object of desire “tal objeto” [a remarkable object] to that of one lost at sea. Sanity cannot "capture such beauty or make sense of such feeling; only wit suffices to command the paradox and to yoke the extremes." In this blinding light where good sense goes delirious, the reasoned esteem of friendship and the passion of love are indistinguishable.

== Sources ==
- Martin, Adrienne. The rhetoric of female friendship in the lyric of Sor Violante del Cielo. Journal of the Society for Renaissance and Baroque Hispanic Poetry. 3(2): 57–71. 1997
- Machado, Diogo Barbosa. “Sor Violante do Ceo.” Biblioteca Lusitana. 3 vols. Lisboa: n.p., 1933.
- Chase, Gilbert. “Origins of the Lyric Theater in Spain.” The Musical Quarterly 25.3 (1939): 292–305.
- ---. The Music of Spain. 2nd ed. New York: Dover Publications, 1959.
- Cortes, Narciso Alonso. Villancicos y representaciones populares de Castilla. Valladolid: Institución Cultural Simancas, 1982.
- Forster, Merlin H. “Theatricality in the Villancicos of Sor Juana de la Cruz.” Engendering the Early Modern Stage. New Orleans: UP of the South, 1999.
- Halling, Anna-Lisa. "“Space, Performance, and Subversion in Sóror Violante do Céu’s Villancicos.” Comedia Performance 14:1 (2017): 71–105.
- La Cruz, Juana Inés de. Obras completas. Vol. 2. Toluca, México: Instituto Mexiquense de Cultura, 1994.
- Laird, Paul R. Towards a History of the Spanish Villancico. Warren, Michigan: Harmonie Park Press, 1997.
- Pociña López, Andrés José. Sóror Violante do Céu (1607–1693). Madrid: Ediciones del Orto, 1998.
- Sánchez Romeralo, Antonio. El Villancico (Estudios sobre la lírica popular en los siglos XV y XVI). Madrid: Editorial Gredos, 1969.
- St. Amour, Sister Mary Paulina. A Study of the Villancico Up to Lope de Vega. Washington, D.C.: The Catholic University of America Press, 1940.
- Taylor, Thomas S. “The Spanish High Baroque Motet and Villancico: Style and Performance.” Early Music 12.1 (1984): 64–73.
- Tenorio, Martha Lilia. “El villancico novohispano.” Sor Juana y su mundo. Ed. Sara Poot Herrera. México: El claustro de Sor Juana UP, 1995.
- Underberg, Natalie. “Sor Juana’s Villancicos: Context, Gender, and Genre.” Western Folklore, 60.4 (2001): 297–316.
- Violante do Ceo, Soror. Parnaso Lusitano. 2 vols. Lisboa: n.p., 1733.
