= Guilherme de Melo =

Guilherme de Melo (1931 in Lourenço Marques, Portuguese Mozambique – 29 June 2013 in Lisbon) was a Portuguese journalist, novelist, and activist. Melo lived through the protracted war of independence in the Portuguese colony of Mozambique in the 1960s and 1970s. Openly gay himself, Melo's novel The Shadow of the Days (A Sombra dos Dias) is an account of growing up gay in the privileged environment of a white family in colonial Mozambique before the outbreak of war and of being openly gay against the background of an increasingly bitter anti-colonial war. After the Carnation Revolution and the independence of Mozambique in 1975, Melo went to Portugal.

Other titles: Ainda Havia Sol (The Sun was still Shining), O Homem que Odiava a Chuva (The Man who Hated Rain), As Vidas de Elisa Antunes (The Lives of Elisa Antunes), O que Houver de Morrer (He who will have to Die) and Como um Rio sem Pontes (Like a Bridgeless River).
