= Maria Gabriela Llansol =

Portuguese writer and translator

Maria Gabriela Llansol

Maria Gabriela Llansol Nunes da Cunha Rodrigues Joaquim (24 November 1931 – 3 March 2008) was a Portuguese writer and translator.

== Life ==
Of Spanish descent, she was born in Lisbon and received a degree in law from the University of Lisbon and then a degree in educational science. Llansol went on to operate a nursery school. In 1962, she published her first collection of short stories Os Pregos na Erva. She and her husband moved to Belgium in 1965, where she worked in a community school. Llansol was unhappy with her first two works and viewed her literary career as starting in 1977. She moved back to Portugal in the mid-1980s, settling in Sintra. Llansol took an independent view of history ignoring the accepted Portuguese heroes and looking for alternative figures. She also created her own structure within her writing introducing counterfactual narration within her writing. Her writing ignored the idea of narrative and she would use en-dashes, '____________’ and ‘[____________]’ to allow the reader to complete her writing. She did not aim to be popular, but believed that her writing would live longer than she did.

She also translated French poetry by writers such as Baudelaire, Apollinaire and Rimbaud into Portuguese. Some of her own work has been translated into Spanish and French.

She married Augusto Joaquim; he died in 2004.

She died of cancer at the age of 76. After her death, there have been conferences in Portugal and Brazil to discuss her creations. Her work has been translated into several languages, but not initially English.

== Selected works ==
- Depois de os Pregos na Erva, short stories (1973)
- O Livro das Comunidades ("The Book of Communities") (1977)
- Um Falcão no Punho ("A Falcon on the Wrist"), diary (1985)
- Finita, diary (1987)
- Um Beijo Dado Mais tarde, novel (1990) received the Associação Portuguesa de Escritores (APE) prize for best novel
- Inquérito às quatro confidências, diary (1996)
- Amigo e Amiga ("He and She"), novel (2006) received the APE prize for best novel
