= Inês Pedrosa =

Portuguese journalist, novelist, short story (born 1962)

- Born: 15 August 1962 (age 63); Coimbra, Portugal
- Occupations: Journalist, novelist, short story writer, children's writer, playwright

Inês Pedrosa (born 15 August 1962) is a Portuguese journalist, novelist, short story writer, children's writer and playwright. She was director of the Casa Fernando Pessoa. Her novels have also been published in Brazil, Croatia, Ukraine, Germany, Italy and Spain.

== Career ==
By appointment, Inês Pedrosa directed Casa Fernando Pessoa from February 2008 to her resignation from the post in April 2014. She was also the director of the Casa Fernando Pessoa.

In October 2017, she launched a publishing house - Siblia Publications - dedicated to women's essays.

Several works by Inês Pedrosa are translated into Italian, Croatian, German and Spanish.

In 2018, the novels Nas tuas Mãos and Fazes-me Falta were published for the first time in English and the novel Fazes-me Falta in French, following the acquisition of the copyright by Amazon Crossing.

== Works ==
- Mais Ninguém Tem (1991, children's short story)
- A Instrução dos Amantes (1992, novel)
- Nas Tuas Mãos (1997, novel)
- Fazes-me Falta (pt) (2002)
- Fica Comigo Esta Noite (pt) (2003)
- 12 Mulheres e 1 Cadela (2005, play)
- A Eternidade e o Desejo ( 2005, novel)
- Os Íntimos ( 2010, novel)
- Dentro de Ti Ver o Mar ( 2012, novel)
- Desamparo ( 2015, novel)
- Desnorte ( 2016, short-stories)
- O Processo Violeta ( 2019, novel)

== Awards ==
- Revelation Award from the Clube de Jornalistas (1985)
- Journalism Award for Mulheres magazine (1985)
- Sampaio Bruno Award from the Clube de Jornalistas do Porto (1992)
- Prémio Máxima da Literatura for Nas Tuas Mãos
- Prémio Máxima de Literatura for "Os Íntimos"
