= José Bragança de Miranda =

Portuguese sociologist (born 1953)

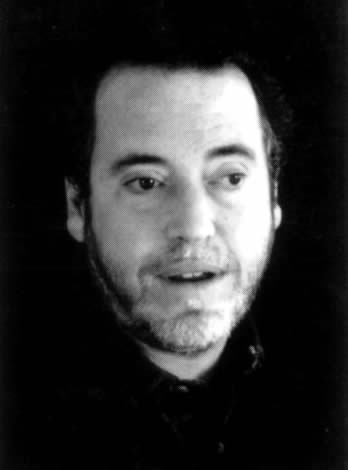
José Bragança de Miranda

José Augusto Bragança de Miranda, born in Lisbon, 1953 is licentiate in sociology, with a Ph.D. in communication, is professor at the Communications Sciences Department of New University of Lisbon, lecturing in "Political Theory" and "Cultural Criticism."

Former director of the Department and President of the CECL (Centre for Research on Communication and Languages), and responsible for the "Specialisation in Culture and Communication" at the same department and is editor in chief of the "Review of Communication and Languages" (22 issues).

He is author of several essays on cultural, political and aesthetical subjects. In 1994 he published a book on "Analytic of Actuality," having in print another book on "Politics and Modernity." His current research is centered on culture and technology.
