= Ana Plácido =

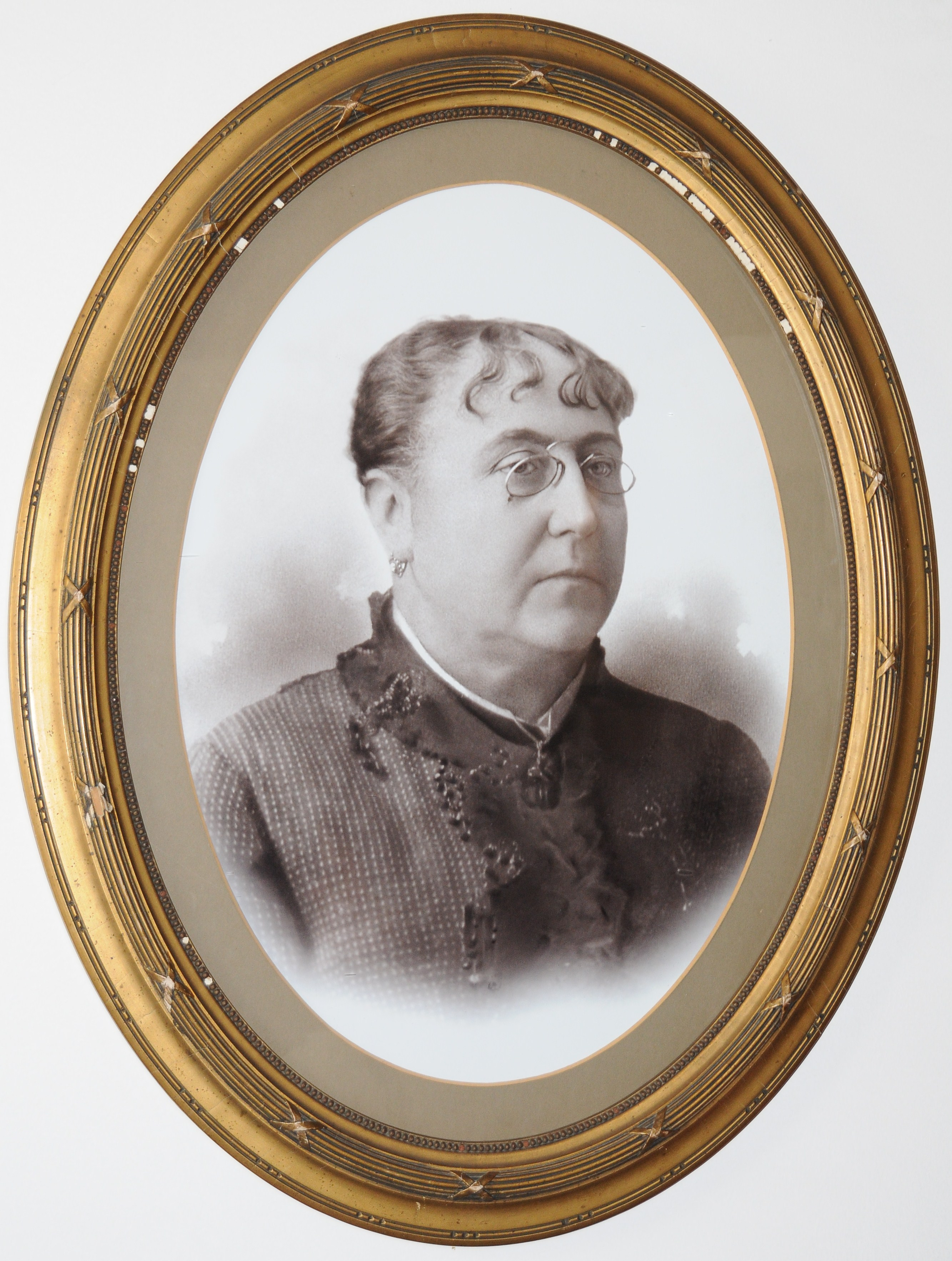
Ana Placido

Ana Plácido (1831—1895) was a Portuguese novelist and author. Her best known work is the 1871 novel Herança de Lágrimas (English: A Legacy of Tears), and she is also noted for an autobiographical book Luz Coada por Ferros (English: Light Filtered Through Bars; published in 1863). She was married to the author Camilo Castelo Branco, with whom she earlier had an extra-marital affair while she was married.

Herança de Lágrimas tells the story of a married woman named Diana who decides not to engage in adultery after reading the story of her mother's fate after doing similarly. The novel was written to try and "voice a female-centred perspective on life" according to the academics Hilary Owen and Cláudio Pazos Alonso.

On March 9, 1888, Camilo and Ana were finally married. Camilo Castelo Branco, tormented by blindness and paralysis resulting from syphilis that he had suffered for years, committed suicide in 1890. Ana Plácido would die years later, suddenly, on the night of September 20, 1895, in São Miguel de Seide; her sons would soon follow her (Manuel had already died in 1877): Nuno died in 1896 and Jorge in 1900.
