= Dulce Maria Cardoso =

Portuguese writer (born 1964)

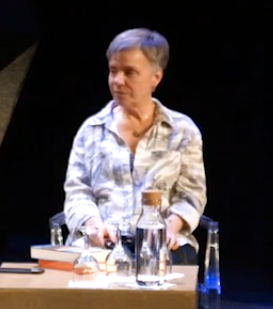
Dulce Maria Cardoso in FOLIO - Óbidos International Literary Festival, 2019

Dulce Maria Cardoso (born 1964) is a Portuguese writer. She was born in Fonte Longa, Carrazeda de Ansiães, Trás-os-Montes but moved to Luanda, Angola as an infant. Her family came back to Portugal in 1975 along with half a million other retornados as Portugal's overseas colonies gained independence.

She studied law at the University of Lisbon and worked as a lawyer before taking up writing on a full-time basis. Her fiction includes novels as well as short stories. Her debut novel Campo de Sangue (2002) won the Grand Prize "Acontece de Romance". Os Meus Sentimentos won the EU Prize for Literature, and O Chão dos Pardais (2009) won the Portuguese Pen Club Award. Her fourth novel The Return (O Retorno) (2011) was also published to wide acclaim.

In Portugal, her first novels were published by Edições Asa, and O Retorno was published by Tinta da China. In Brazil, Companhia das Letras published Campo de sangue in 2005, Tinta da China O Retorno in 2011 and in 2022, Todavia released Eliete - A Vida Normal, her fifth novel, which will be continued in two parts.

== Works ==
- Campo de Sangue; novel; Ed. Asa 2002
- Os meus Sentimentos; novel; Ed. Asa 2005
- Até Nós; short stories; Ed. Asa 2008
- O Chão dos Pardais; novel; Ed. Asa 2009
- The Return (O Retorno), Quercus Publishing, 2017; Ed. Tinta da China 2011. El retorno, novela. Ed. La Umbría y la Solana, 2018
- A Bíblia de Lôá (children's literature), Ed. Tinta da China, 2014 - split in 2 volumes: Lôá e a véspera do primeiro dia and Lôá perdida no paraíso
- Tudo são histórias de amor (short stories), Ed. Tinta da China, 2014
- Eliete - A Vida Normal, Ed. Tinta da China, 2018
- Autobiografia Não Autorizada 2, Ed. Tinta da China, 2023

== Awards ==
- Her first work "Campo de Sangue" was distinguished in 2002 with the award Grande Prémio Acontece de Romance
- For her first romance "Os meus Sentimentos" she received in 2009 the award "Prémio da União Europeia para a Literatura"
- "Chão dos Pardais" was distinguished with the award "Prémio Pen Club Português" in 2010 and also that same year the award "Prémio Ciranda"
- Eliete – A Normal Life was longlisted for the 2025 International Dublin Literary Award.
