= Olga Gonçalves =

Portuguese poet and novelist

Olga Teixeira Gonçalves (1929–2004) was a Portuguese poet and novelist. She was born in Luanda. Her debut novel A Floresta em Bremerhaven (The Forest in Bremerhaven) was published and received great acclaim. A study of Portuguese immigration to Western Europe, the book won the Ricardo Malheiros Prize. Another novel O Emigrante là-bas deals with similar themes. She also wrote several volumes of poetry.

== Works ==
- Movimento (1972) (poetry)
- 25 Composições e 11 Provas de Artista (1973)
- Mandei-lhe Uma Boca (1973)
- Só de Amor (1975) (sonetos)
- A Floresta em Bremerhaven (1975)
- O Emigrante là-bas (1978)
- Ora Esguardai (1982)
- Olotolilisobi (1983)
- Rudolfo (1985)
- Sara (1986)
- Armandina e Luciano, o Traficante de Canários (1988)
- Eis uma História (1993)
- Contar de subversão
- Treze contos de sobressalto
- A palabra de romance
- Uma história de desamor
- Imitaçao daa morta
- Eu, o romamantismo de ser
- O homem que renegou a luz
- A cruz vazia
