= Camilo Castelo Branco =

Portuguese writer (1825–1890)

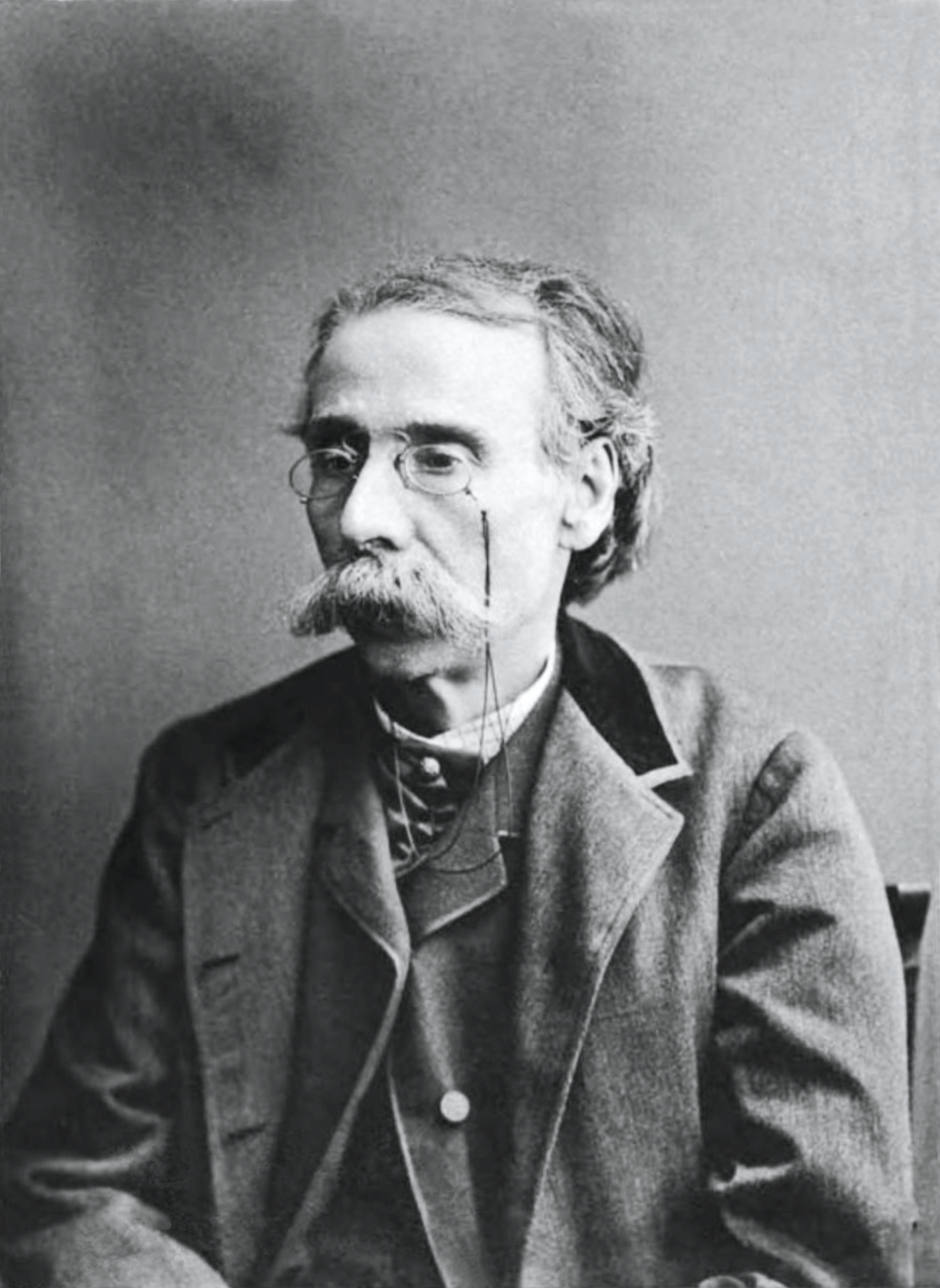
- Born: Camilo Ferreira Botelho Castelo Branco; 16 March 1825; Lisbon, Kingdom of Portugal
- Died: 1 June 1890 (aged 65); São Miguel de Seide, Vila Nova de Famalicão, Kingdom of Portugal
- Occupations: novelist, playwright, essayist
- Writing career
- Genre: Romance novel
- Movement: Romanticism

Camilo Castelo Branco, 1st Viscount of Correia Botelho (Portuguese pronunciation: [kɐˈmilu kɐʃˈtɛlu ˈbɾɐ̃ku]; 16 March 1825 – 1 June 1890), was a prolific Portuguese writer of the 19th century, having produced over 260 books (mainly novels, plays and essays). His writing is considered original in that it combines the dramatic and sentimental spirit of Romanticism with a highly personal combination of sarcasm, bitterness and dark humour. He is also celebrated for his peculiar wit and anecdotal character, as well as for his turbulent (and ultimately tragic) life.

His writing, which is centred in the local and the picturesque and is in a general sense affiliated with the Romantic tradition, is often regarded in contrast to that of Eça de Queiroz – a cosmopolitan dandy and a fervorous proponent of Realism, who was Camilo's literary contemporary in spite of being 20 years younger. This tension between Camilo and Eça – often dubbed by critics the literary guerrilla – has been interpreted as a synthesis of the two great tendencies present in the Portuguese literature of the 19th century.

Allegations that he was initiated in Freemasonry in 1846, are somewhat contradictory as there are indications that, around the same time, during the Revolution of Maria da Fonte, he fought in favor of the Miguelists as "helper to the orders of the Scottish General Ranald MacDonell", who was active in the revived Order of Saint Michael of the Wing precisely to combat Masonry. Similarly, much of his literature demonstrates his ideals of legitimism and as a conservative and Catholic traditionalist.

== Biography ==
Camilo was born out of wedlock and orphaned in infancy, although his origins lay ultimately in Northern Portugal's provincial aristocracy (his father, Manuel Joaquim Botelho Castelo Branco, was the son of an illustrious household in the environs of Vila Real, but lived in near-poverty due to the strict law of primogeniture which then largely excluded younger sons from inheritance). Camilo was a descendant of marranos in Castelo Branco. Camilo spent his early years in a village in Trás-os-Montes, where he was educated at home by three unmarried aunts. At the age of 13, he enrolled at the Catholic seminary of nearby Vila Real, where he was educated by Catholic priests. During his teenage years, he fell in love with the poetry of Luís de Camões and Manuel Maria Barbosa de Bocage, while Fernão Mendes Pinto gave him a lust for adventure. In spite of this interest in literature, and of his remarkable abilities in Greek and Latin, Camilo was a distracted student and grew up to be undisciplined and proud.

From the age of 17 to his early 20s, he intermittently studied medicine and theology in Porto and Coimbra and eventually chose to become a writer. After a spell of journalistic work in Porto and Lisbon he proceeded to the episcopal seminary in Porto in order to study for the priesthood. During this period Camilo wrote a number of religious works and translated the work of François-René de Chateaubriand. Camilo actually took minor holy orders, but his restless nature drew him away from the priesthood and he devoted himself to literature for the rest of his life. He was arrested twice; the first time for having unearthed the remains of his first wife (whom he had married at the age of 16, and who had died at 24) and the second due to his adulterous affair with Ana Plácido, who was married at the time.

His first period of incarceration was short, apparently thanks to the intervention of Teixeira de Queiroz, an influential judge and, coincidentally, father of the renowned José Maria de Eça de Queiroz. During his second and longer incarceration he wrote what most consider to be his best and most characteristic work Doomed Love. Later this phase of his life would also inspire him to write his Memórias do Cárcere (literally "Memories of Prison"), in which he describes the meanders of the then miserable and overcrowded prison of Relação, at the centre of Porto, intertwined with intimate ramblings of the imagination and biographical fragments.

Camilo was made a viscount (Visconde de Correia Botelho) in 1885 in recognition of his contributions to literature, and when his health deteriorated and he could no longer write, parliament gave him a pension for life. In 1886, he wrote "Esboço de crítica: Otelo, o Mouro de Veneza". Going blind (because of syphilis) and suffering from chronic nervous disease, Castelo Branco committed suicide with a revolver in 1890, while sitting in his now-famous wooden rocking chair.

== Works ==
Camilo Castelo Branco is probably the most prolific of all Portuguese writers, his work including novels, plays, verse, and essays. In addition, Camilo was the first Portuguese writer able to support himself financially from his writing alone. In all, his publications number about five hundred and sixty, but he is best known for his novels. Even though Camilo churned out a lot of work to pay the bills, he never lost his individuality. His familiarity with personalities allowed him to enliven his writing with a succession of memorable characters and Portuguese types, such as the "brasileiro" (a returned Portuguese emigrant who had made his fortune in Brazil), the old "Fidalgo" (nobleman) of the north of Portugal, and the Minho priest.

Camilo's novels may be divided into three periods. The first period comprises his romances of the imagination, of which Os Mistérios de Lisboa, in the style of Eugène Sue, is a fair example.

The second period includes his novels of manners, a style he developed and remained the chief exponent of until the appearance of O Crime de Padre Amaro by Eça de Queiroz. In these novels he combines realism and idealism, and perfectly captures the domestic and social life of Portugal in the early part of the 19th century. His 1866 novel The Fall of an Angel is a political satire about a man from the countryside who become integrated in the corrupt and luxurious world of politics in Lisbon.

The third period embraces his writings in the realms of history, biography and literary criticism. Among these may be cited Noites de Lamego, Cousas leves e pesadas, Cavar em ruínas, Memórias do Bispo do Grão Pará and Boémia do Espírito.

Among the most notable of his romances are O Romance de um Homem Rico, his favorite, Retrato de Ricardina, Doomed Love, the collection of novellas Novelas do Minho and A Brasileira de Prazins. Many of his novels are autobiographical, like Onde está a felicidade?, Memórias do Cárcere and Vingança. Castelo Branco is an admirable story-teller, largely because he was a brilliant improvisatore, but he does not attempt character study. He has a richness of vocabulary probably unmatched in all Portuguese literature, often using obscure words. At the same time, few Portuguese authors have demonstrated so profound a knowledge of the vernacular tongue. Though nature had endowed Camilo with a poetic temperament, his verses are considered to be mediocre, while his best plays are cast in bold lines and contain powerfully dramatic situations, and his comedies are a triumph of the grotesque, with a mordant tone reminiscent of the work of Gil Vicente.

== Selected bibliography ==
- Anátema (1851)
- Os Mistérios de Lisboa (1854)
- A Filha do Arcediago (1854)
- Livro Negro de Padre Dinis (1855)
- A Neta do Arcediago (1856)
- Onde Está a Felicidade? (1856) (English title: Where Is Happiness?)
- Um Homem de Brios (1856)
- Lágrimas Abençoadas (1857)
- Cenas da Foz (1857)
- Carlota Ângela (1858)
- Vingança (1858)
- O Que Fazem Mulheres (1858) (English title: What Women Do)
- Doze Casamentos Felizes (1861)
- O Romance de um Homem Rico (1861)
- As Três Irmãs
- Amor de Perdição (1862) (ISBN 0-85051-509-2) (English title: Doomed Love (2000) – ISBN 0-943722-27-6; Love of Perdition (2016) – ISBN 978-0-9938568-2-2)
- Coisas Espantosas (1862)
- O Irónico (1862)
- Coração, Cabeça e Estômago (1862)
- Estrelas Funestas (1862)
- Anos de Prosa (1858)
- Aventuras de Basílio Fernandes Enxertado (1863)
- O Bem e o Mal (1863)
- Estrelas Propícias (1863)
- Memórias de Guilherme do Amaral (1863)
- Agulha em Palheiro (1863)
- Amor de Salvação (1864)
- A Filha do Doutor Negro (1864)
- Vinte Horas de Liteira (1864)
- O Esqueleto (1865)
- A Sereia (1865)
- A Enjeitada (1866)
- O Judeu (1866)
- O Olho de Vidro (1866)
- A Queda dum Anjo (1866) (English title: The Fall of an Angel (1991))
- O Santo da Montanha (1)
- A Bruxa do Monte Córdova (1867)
- Os Mistérios de Fafe (1868)
- O Retrato de Ricardina (1868)
- Compêndio da vida e feitos de José Balsamo, essay (1874)
- A Caveira da Mártir (1876)
- Novelas do Minho (1875–1877)
- Eusébio Macário (1879)
- A Corja (1880)
- Luiz de Camões: Notas Biographicas (1880)
- A Brasileira de Prazins (1882) (English title: The Brazilian Girl from Prazens)
- D. Luiz de Portugal: Neto do Prior do Crato 1601–1660 (1883)
- O Vinho do Porto (1884)
- Esboço de Crítica – Otelo, o Mouro de Veneza (1886)

== Film and television adaptations ==
- Amor de Perdição (TV series) (1965)
- Amor de Perdição (1979) by Manoel de Oliveira
- Um Amor de Perdição (2009) by Mario Barroso
- Mistérios de Lisboa (2010) by Raúl Ruiz
- O caderno negro (2018) by Valeria Sarmiento
- Memórias do Cárcere(2026) by Sérgio Graciano
