= Ana Filomena Amaral =

Portuguese writer (born 1961)

Ana Filomena Leite Amaral
- Born: 4 September 1961 (age 64); Avintes, Portugal
- Occupations: Novelist, translator, educator
- Years active: 35
- Known for: Novels

Ana Filomena Leite Amaral or Ana Filomena Amaral (born 4 September 1961) is a Portuguese novelist, historian, and translator.

== Early life ==
Amaral was born in Avintes, in the municipality of Vila Nova de Gaia in the north of Portugal. Between 1980 and 1984 she studied archaeology and history at the University of Porto. She then went on to study German and German history at the University of Hannover in Germany and then at the University of Coimbra in Portugal, where she also studied English. She also took a course in Documentary Sciences and Library Science at Coimbra University. As an archaeologist she took part in several excavations in Germany and France.

== Career ==
Amaral was the founder in 1997 of the international arts festival Góis Arte, held annually in Góis, a municipality in the Coimbra District. From 2001, in Coimbra, she organised a three-part conference on the role of women in Portugal, covering: (1) The role of women in the academic struggles of Coimbra in the 1960s; (2) Women in politics. Past, present and future; and (3) What was, what is and will be – the role of women in Portuguese politics? She obtained a master's degree in Contemporary Economic and Social History from the Faculty of Letters at the University of Coimbra in 2008, with a thesis entitled Maria de Lourdes Pintasilgo - The youthful years at the Universitária Católica Feminina, 1952-1956, which was subsequently published, being the first detailed research to be published on the former prime minister of Portugal. In her home town of Lousã, she founded and directs the cultural cooperative, Arte-Via, and, through that, founded and curates the Festival Literário Internacional do Interior (FLII)—Palavras de Fogo (International Literary Festival of the Interior—Words of Fire). She currently works for the Ministry of Education.

== Writing ==
Over a writing career of around 35 years, Amaral has published books ranging from fiction to historical research. In addition to her historical research on Maria de Lourdes Pintasilgo, she has published books on her birthplace of Avintes and on the town of Góis. Her fiction includes:

- 1989 – Uma porta abria-se a fogo. (A door opened with fire)
- 1995 – O segredo do cavalo Marinho. (The secret of the seahorse)
- 2004 – A casa da sorte. (The lucky house), published in English as Vaulted Home. Those who cheated death.
- 2007 – A coroa de Góis. (The crown of Gois)
- 2011 – Pão e água. (Bread and water)
- 2014 - O cassador de muros. Published in English as Chasing Walls.
- 2018 - O Diretor. (First book in the Our Mother trilogy, published in English as The Director)
- 2020 – Gelos. (Ice, second book in the Our Mother trilogy)

Her trilogy, Mãe Nossa, (Our Mother) is dedicated to the earth and to environmental problems. She describes it as the only environmental fiction in the world. The first book in the trilogy has the sea as its main setting and emphasises the role of corruption in environmental problems. The second is about the Arctic Ocean.

As well as English, her books have been translated into Bengali, Russian, Egyptian, Finnish and Bulgarian. In addition to her own publications Amaral also translates the work of others into Portuguese, mainly from German.
