= Doomed Love (novel) =

1862 novel by Camilo Castelo Branco

- Author: Camilo Castelo Branco
- Original title: Amor de Perdição
- Translator: Alice Clemente
- Language: Portuguese
- Publication date: 1862
- Publication place: Portugal
- English publication date: 2000
- ISBN: 978-1-716-45886-6

Doomed Love: A Family Memoir (Portuguese: Amor de Perdição) is an 1862 Portuguese novel by Camilo Castelo Branco.

It was published in English translation by Alice Clemente in 2000.

== Adaptations ==
It has been adapted into several films, like Amor de Perdição from 1978 and the 2009 film Doomed Love, directed by Mario Barroso, and also a telenovela.
