= Jarandilla de la Vera =

Jarandilla de la Vera, Spain
- municipality
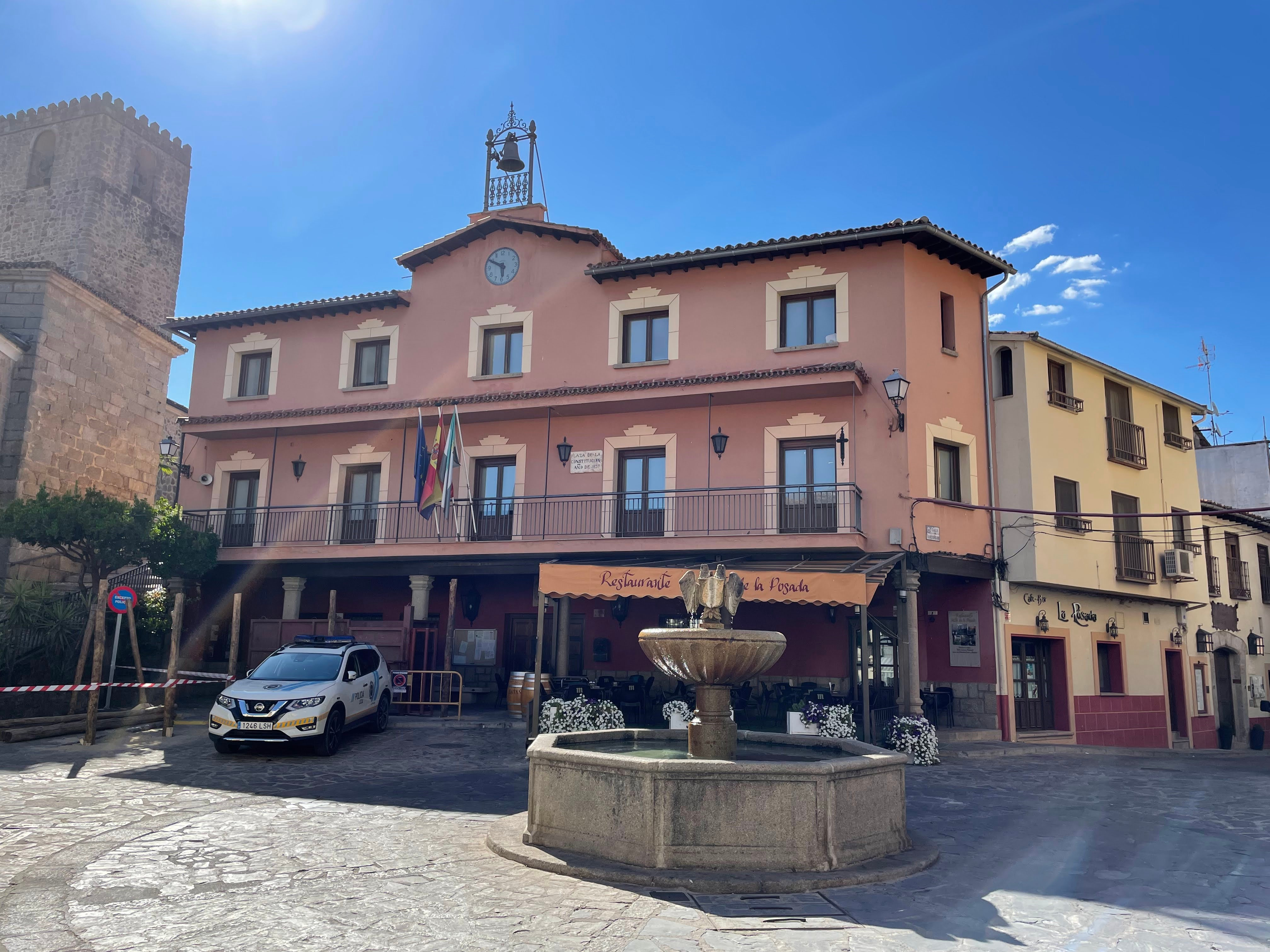
- Town hall

- Coat of arms

- Location within Spain
- Coordinates: 40°7′35″N 5°39′30″W
- Country: Spain
- Autonomous community: Extremadura
- Province: Cáceres
- Municipality: Jarandilla de la Vera

Area
  - Total: 62 km^{2} (24 sq mi)
- Elevation: 585 m (1,919 ft)

Population (2025-01-01)
  - Total: 2,894
  - Density: 47/km^{2} (120/sq mi)
- Time zone: UTC+1 (CET)
  - Summer (DST): UTC+2 (CEST)

Jarandilla de la Vera (Spanish: [xaɾanˈdiʎa ðe la ˈβeɾa]) is a municipality located in the province of Cáceres, Extremadura, Spain. According to the 2005 census (INE), the municipality has a population of 3,080 inhabitants.

== See also ==
- List of municipalities in Cáceres
