= Joana Vaz =

Joana Vaz (c. 1500–after 1570) was a Renaissance humanist and poet in the court of Catherine of Austria, Queen of Portugal.

Catherine's court included a number of scholarly women, including Vaz, Catherine's cousin Maria, and the sisters Angela and Luisa Sigea de Velasco. Vaz served as a maid of honour to Catherine and was reportedly director of the aula regia. Vaz was fluent in Latin, Greek and Hebrew, and is reported to have written extensively in the first. She served as a tutor to Catherine's cousin and to the princess, also called Maria.

Vaz was clearly considered to be an authority by her contemporary scholars: the poet Francisco de Sá de Meneses referred to her as such in a letter, and Pope Paul III was reported to have admired her writing. The poet Clenardus described her as "elegantly trained in literature" and asked her to contribute a poem for the funeral of Erasmus.
