= Maria da Felicidade do Couto Browne =

Portuguese poet (1800–1861)

Maria da Felicidade do Couto Browne (10 January 1797 – 8 or 9 November 1861) was a Portuguese woman poet.

== Life ==
Felicidade do Couto Browne was born in Porto, Portugal. She married Manuel Clamouse Browne, a wealthy port wine merchant of Irish and French descent. They had a daughter, Júlia, who married the Viscount of Vilarinho de São Romão Álvaro Ferreira Teixeira Carneiro de Vasconcelos Girão. Felicidade do Couto Browne died in Porto on either 8 or 9 November 1861.

== Career ==
In order to be published and reviewed without bias, Felicidade do Couto Browne used the pseudonyms 'A Coruja Trovador (The Troubadour Owl)' and 'Sóror Dolores', both of which she also used as titles of her works. Felicidade do Couto Browne's works enjoyed widespread attention amidst Porto's society of the time. She collaborated with the periodicals O Nacional, Miscelânea Política and Eugénio Tavares's Almanaque de Lembranças Luso-Brasileiro. Felicidade do Couto Browne also established a literary salon for writers, which included Arnaldo Gama Luís de Magalhães, Ricardo Guimarães, and Camilo Castelo Branco.

== Legacy ==
At least, three streets have been named after her: in Porto, in Carnide, Lisbon, and in São Domingos de Rana, Cascais.

== Works ==
- 1849 – Sóror Dolores
- 1854 – A Coruja Trovadora (The Troubadour Owl)
- 1854 – Virações da Madrugada (Breeze of Dawn)
- 1854 – Sonetos e Poesias Líricas (Sonnets and Lyrics)
