= Carnide =

- Civil parish
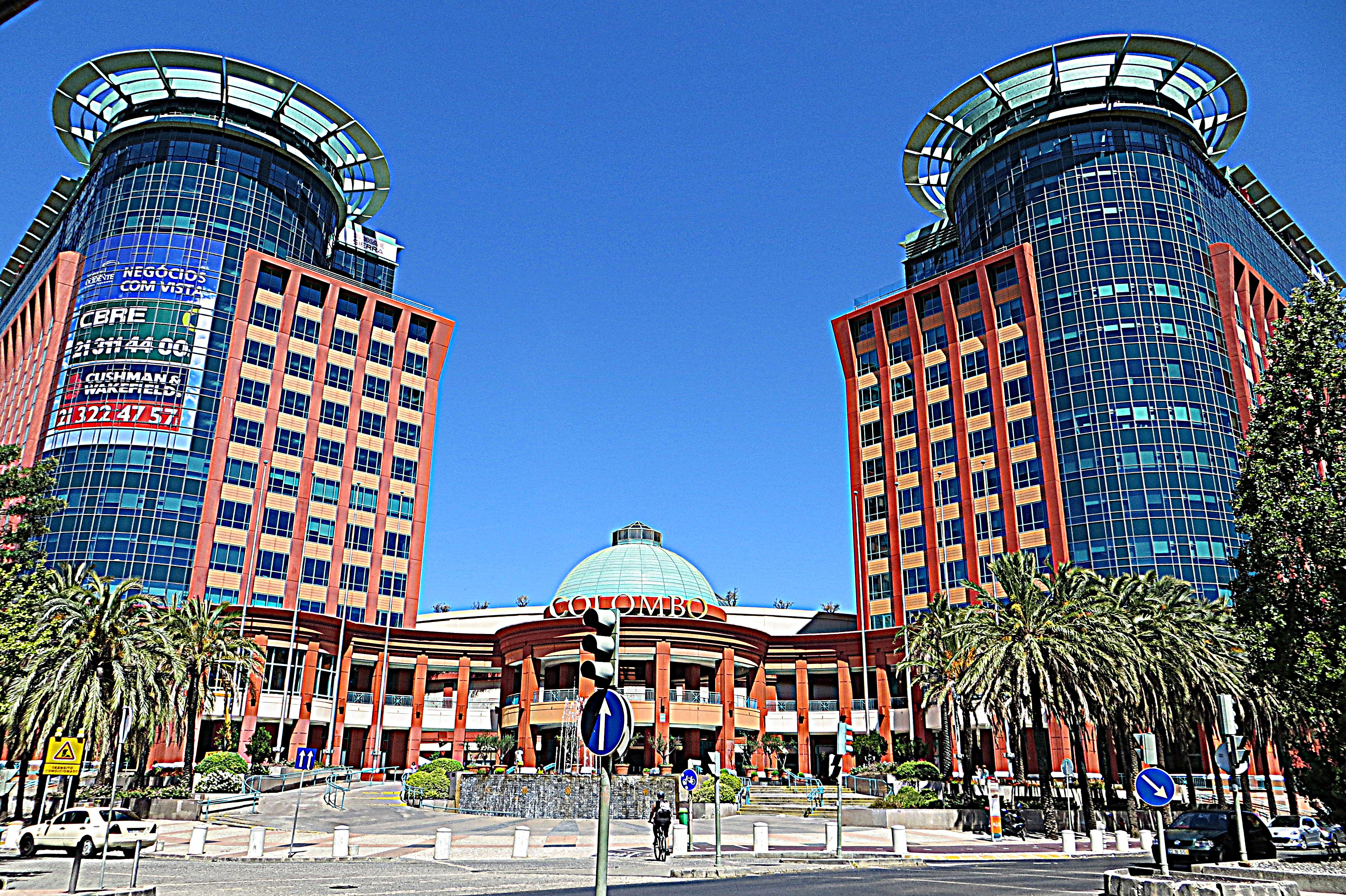
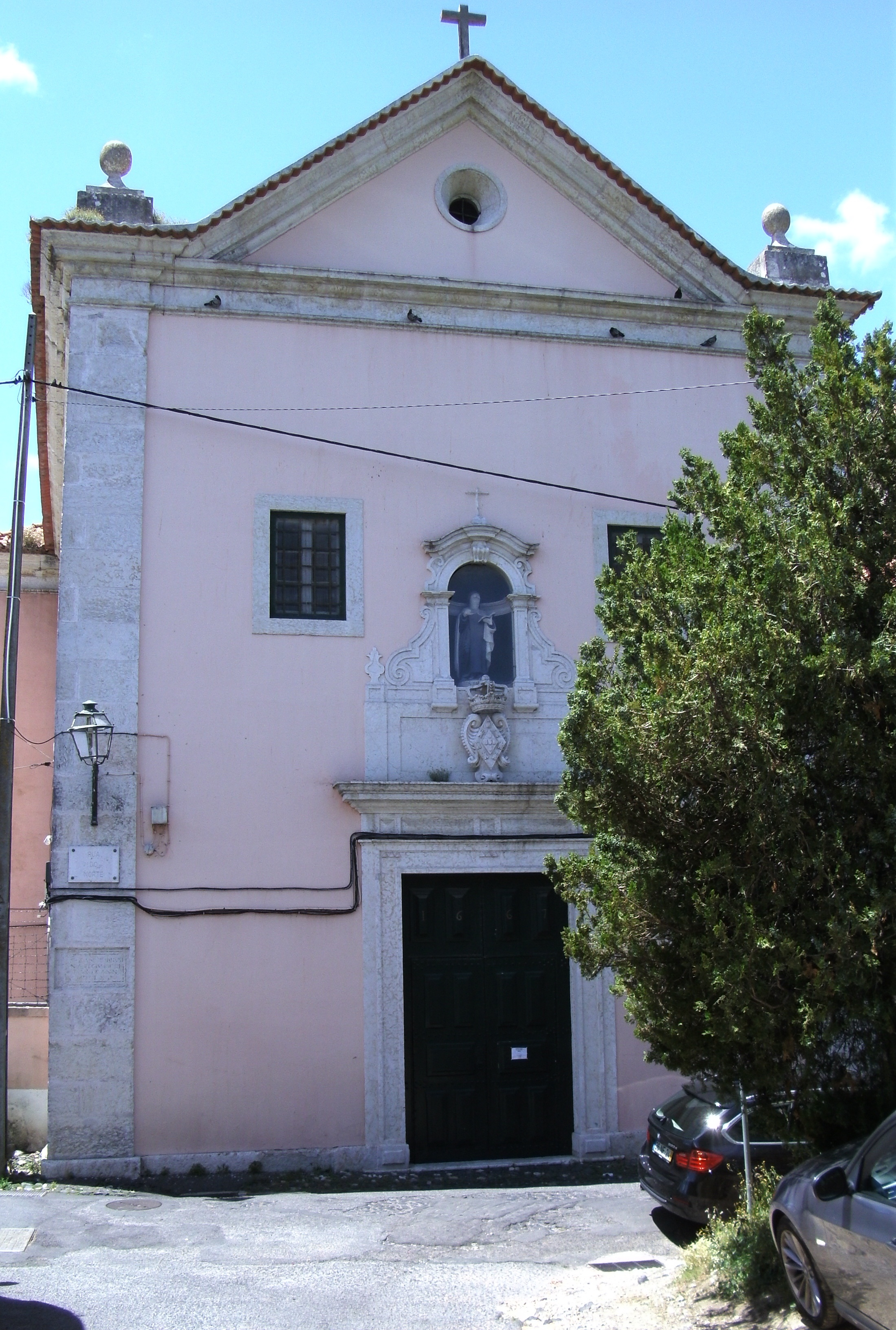
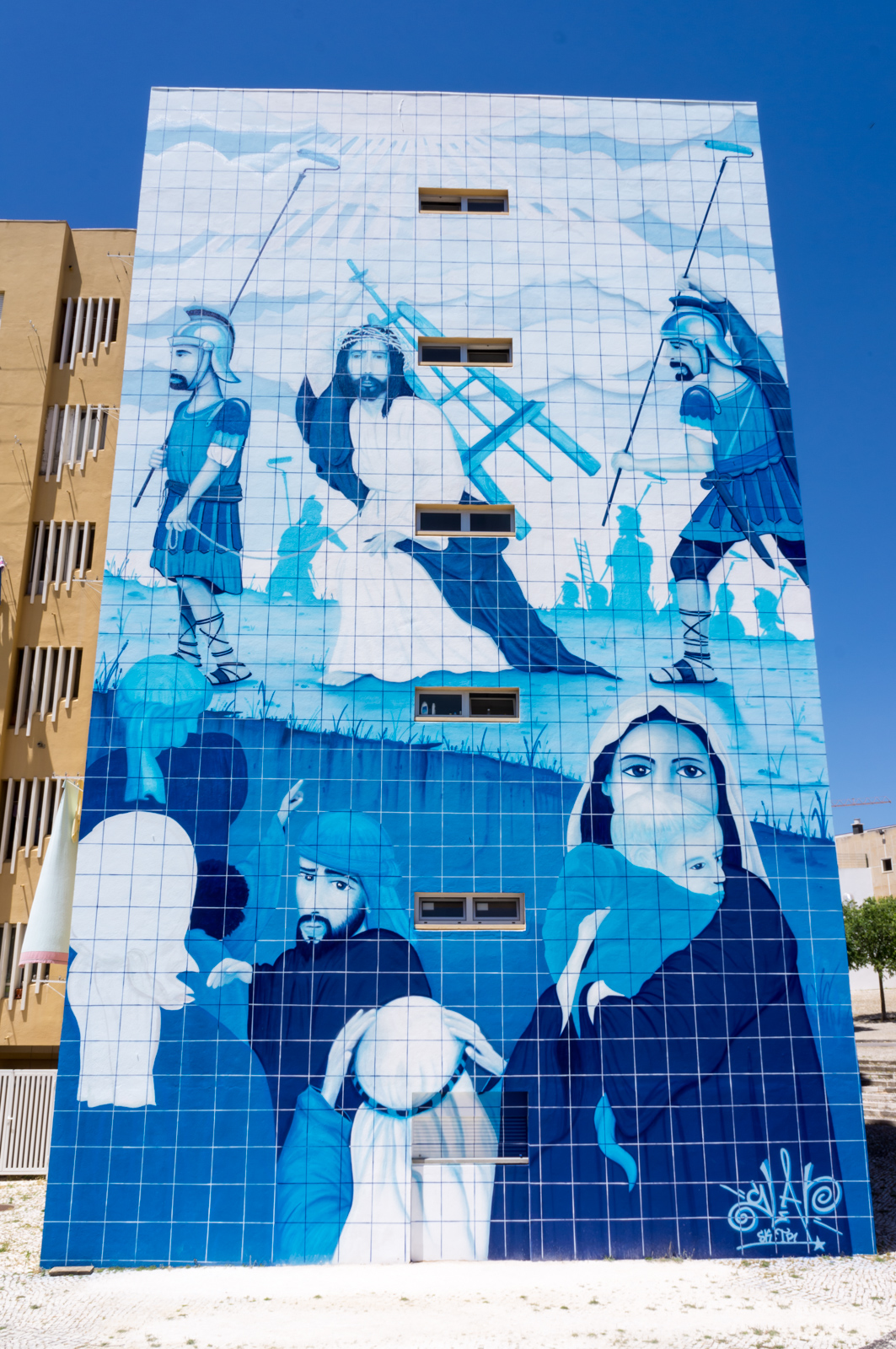
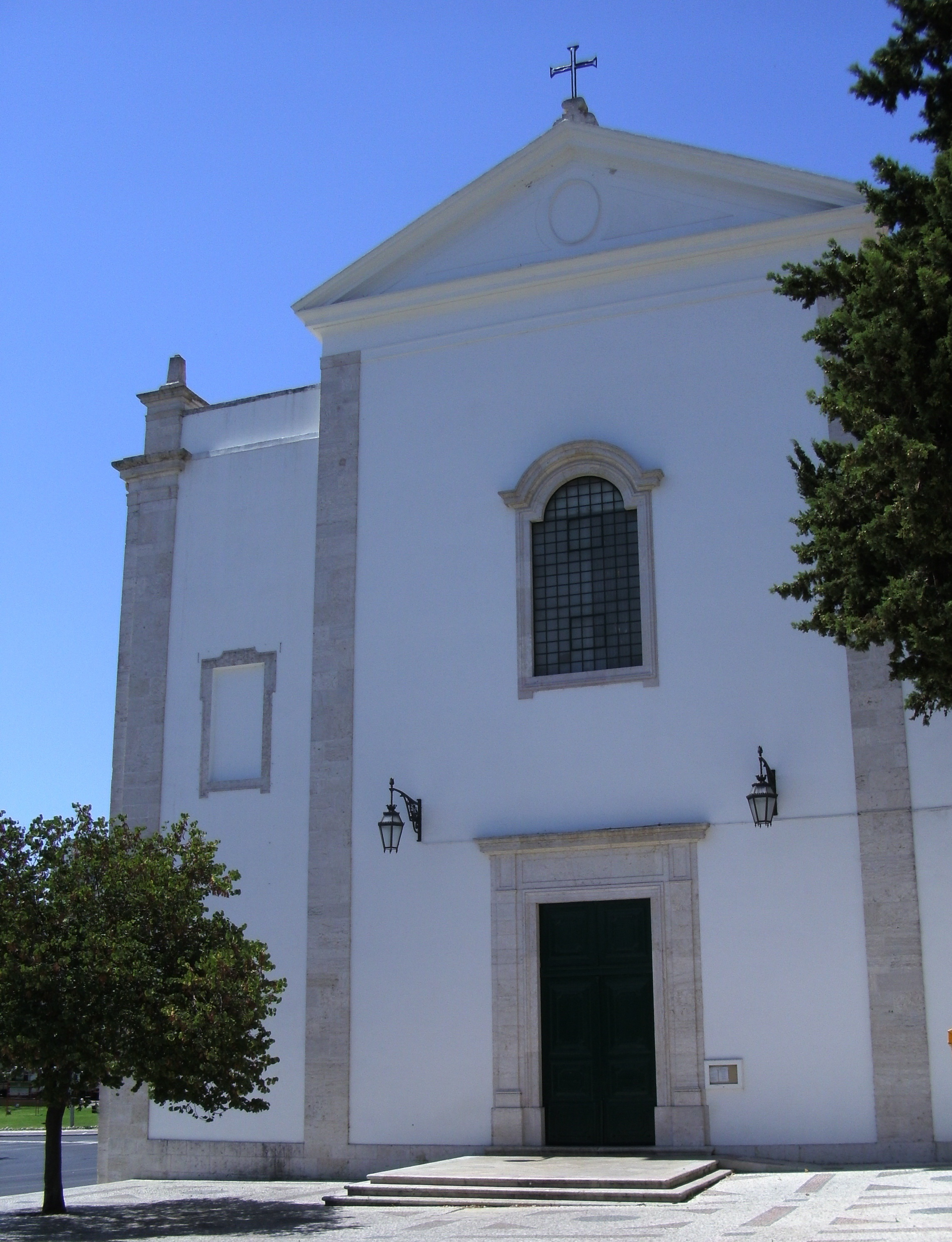
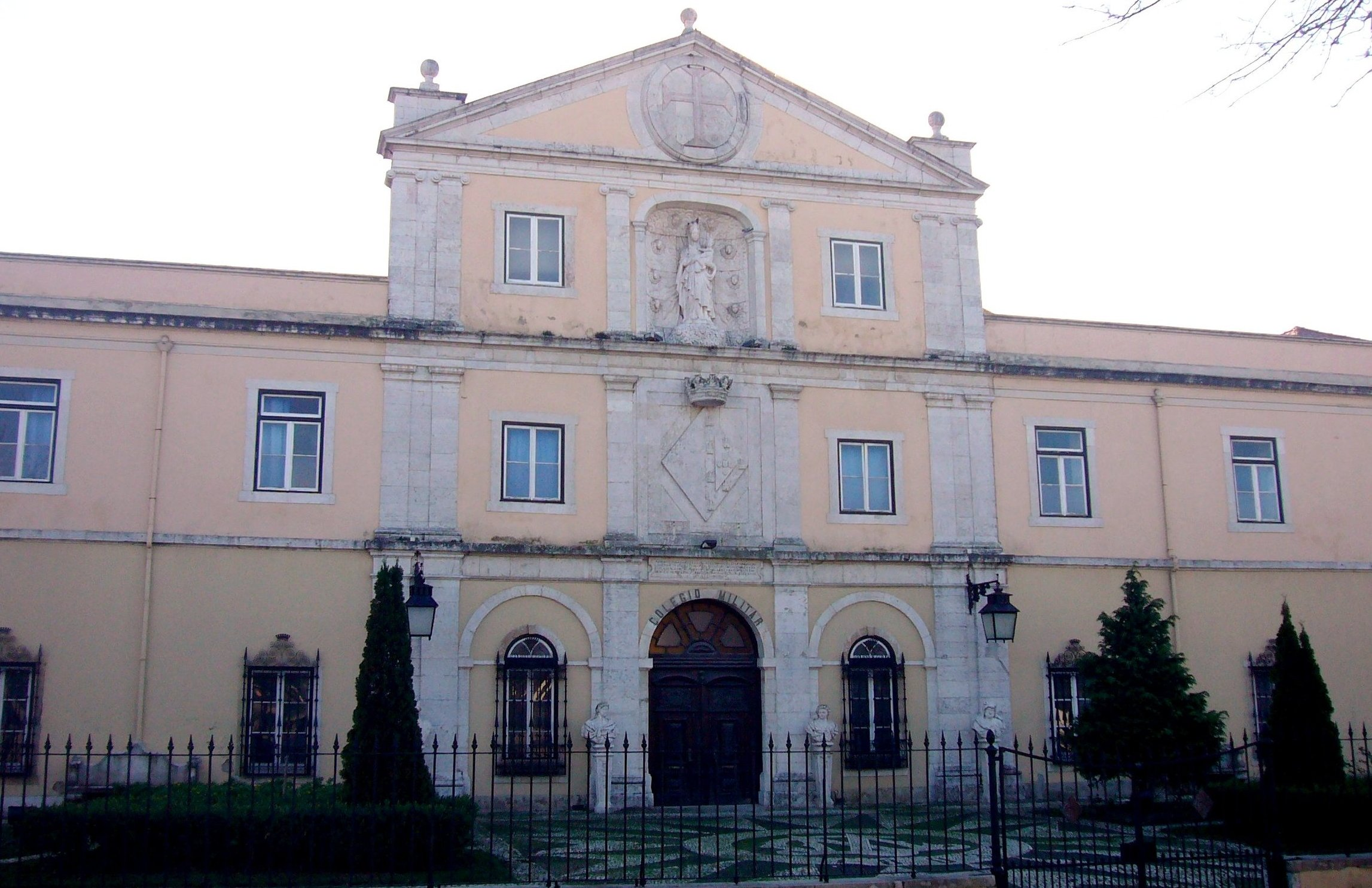
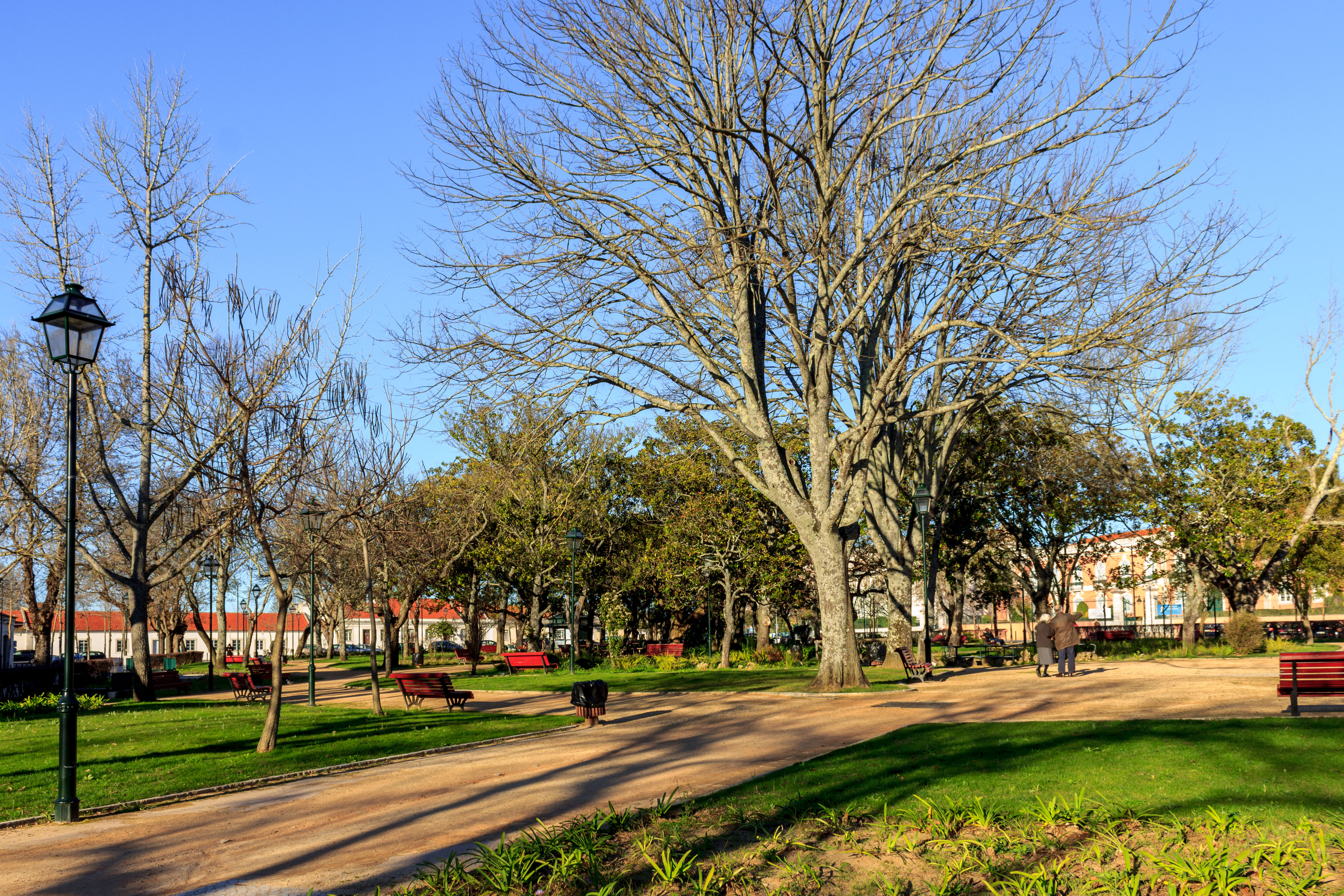
- Clockwise: Colombo Centre; Convento de Santa Teresa de Jesus;street art in Carnide; Luz Church; Largo da Luz;Colégio Militar

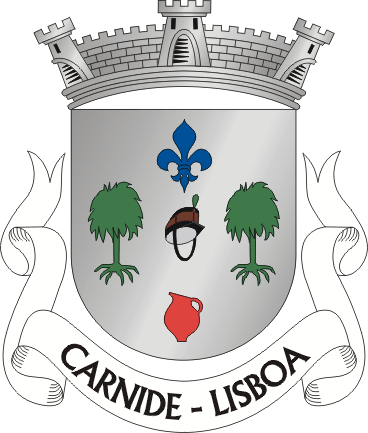
- Coat of arms

- Coordinates: 38.760°N 9.189°W
- Country: Portugal
- Region: Lisbon
- Metropolitan area: Lisbon
- District: Lisbon
- Municipality: Lisbon

Area
  - Total: 3.69 km^{2} (1.42 sq mi)

Population (2021)
  - Total: 18,028
  - Density: 4,890/km^{2} (12,700/sq mi)
- Time zone: UTC+00:00 (WET)
  - Summer (DST): UTC+01:00 (WEST)
- Website: http://www.jf-carnide.pt/

Carnide (Portuguese pronunciation: [kɐɾˈniðɨ]) is a freguesia (civil parish) and typical quarter of Lisbon, the capital city of Portugal. Located in northern Lisbon, Carnide is north of São Domingos de Benfica and Benfica, east of Lumiar, and directly south of Lisbon's border with Odivelas. The population in 2021 was 18,028.

== History ==
=== Antiquity (up to 711) ===
The settlement of the extensive area north of the boundaries of Lisbon up to Odivelas dates back to ancient times, preceding Romanization. In addition to traces of scattered occupation during the Neolithic era, a few small-sized settlements were established, which were swiftly assimilated into Roman culture and economy.

During the 1st century, there existed several farming ventures within the region that now constitutes the freguesia (civil parish) of Carnide, ensuring the sustenance of the settlements there.

In the 4th century, there was a surge in population recorded, owing to the erection of a fresh cathedral, a monastery, and an infirmary (currently known as the Hospital da Luz, which presently houses the Colégio Militar).

=== Muslim rule (711 - 1147) ===
During the Muslim rule of the Iberian Peninsula between the 8th and 12th centuries, the occupation intensified with the consolidation of small homesteads and the development of orchards and gardens. The region was considered the granary of Lisbon and from here, agricultural products regularly supplied the city.

At the time of the conquest of Lisbon, the number of local residents was already significant. They were later joined by many Moors who were either expelled from the city proper (Mouraria) or left voluntarily. Christians and Muslims eventually merged in a short time, erasing religious and cultural differences.

=== Kingdom of Portugal and incorporation into Lisbon (1147–1885) ===
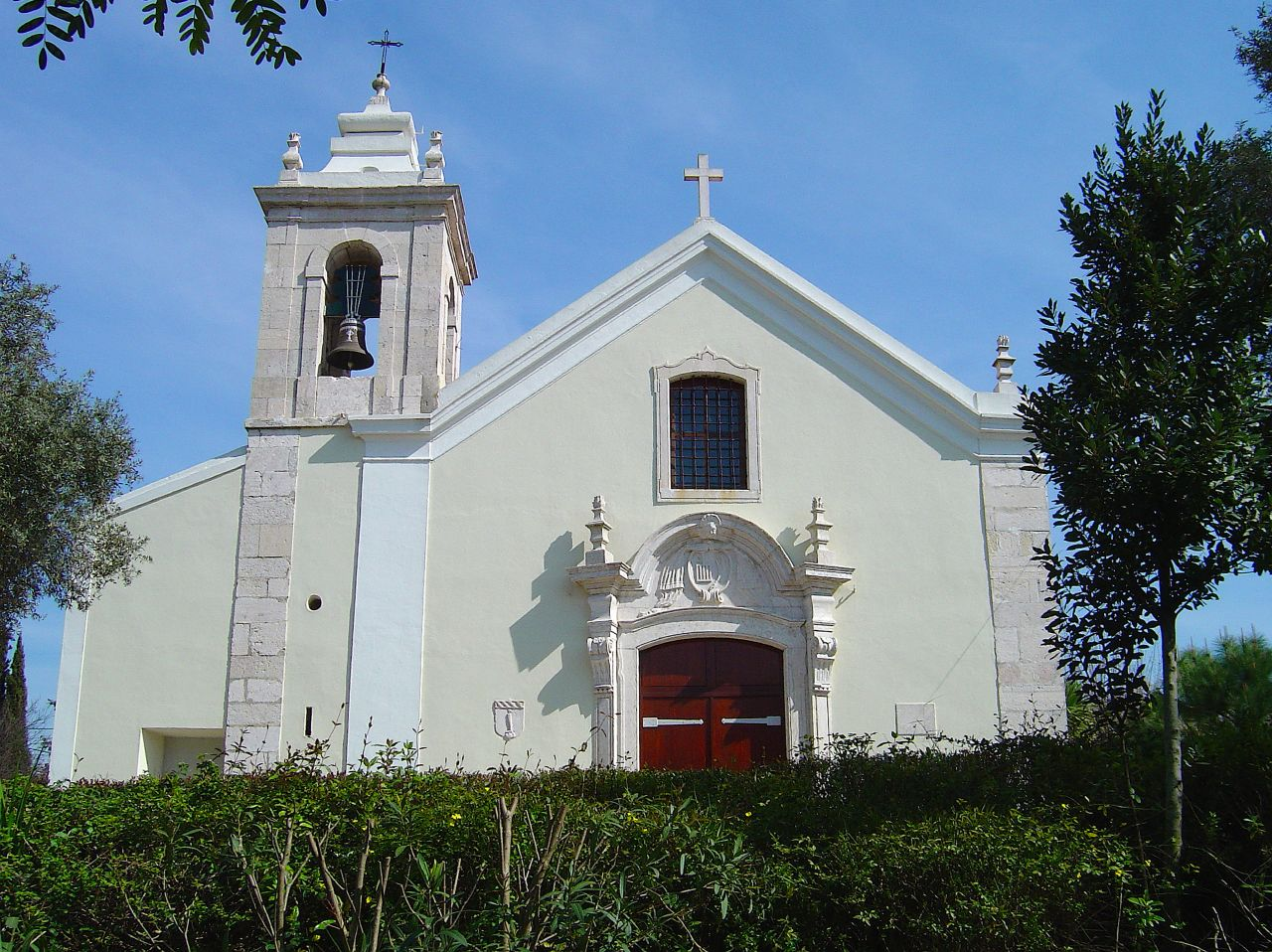
São Lourenço church's façade

The parish is believed to have been formally established in the year 1279. During this period, toponymic recognition became permanently entrenched. The name Carnide is undoubtedly of greater antiquity (Celtic, Latin, or Moorish in origin), yet it started to gain widespread use only in the medieval era.

Renowned for its salubrious air, the parish attracted a number of aristocrats who chose to take up residence in Carnide, thereby enlivening the local economy. This inclination continued until the 16th century when Carnide was transformed into a hamlet, positioned between the Church of Nossa Senhora da Luz and the Church of São Lourenço (1342). It belongs - as the rest of Catholic religious buildings found in the parish - to the Lisbon Patriarchate of the Catholic Church.

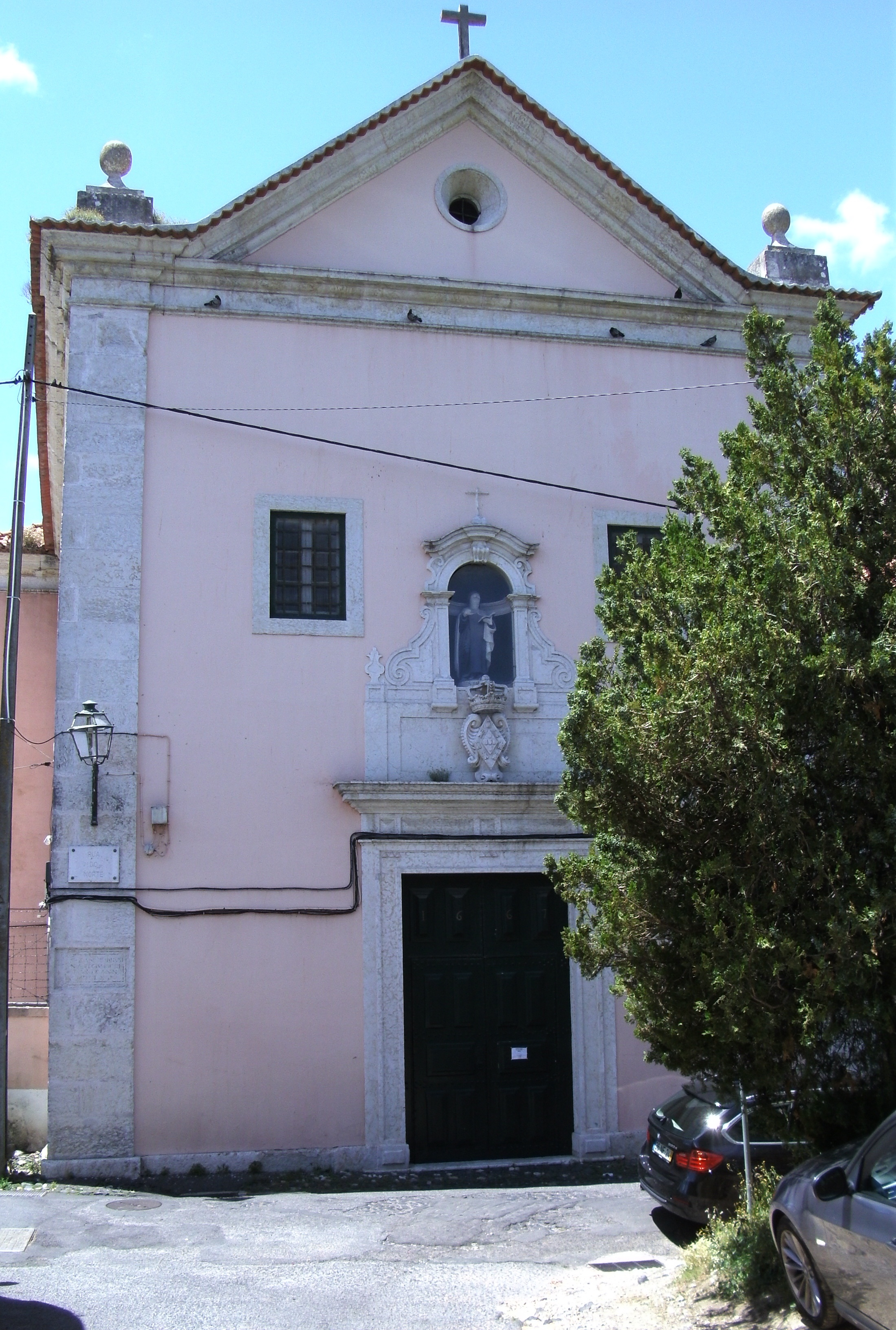
Santa Teresa de Jesus de Carnide Convent

Many noblemen arrived in Carnide to convalesce from military campaigns in the conquest of North Africa during the reign of King Afonso V. The monarch himself, who in 1442 granted land in the vicinity of Carnide, is believed to have temporarily resided here, as did King John II, who dispatched a letter to the Baron of Alvito dated March 24, 1462, and signed in Carnide.

In 1463, the veneration of Our Lady of Light commenced. This was the year in which a young man by the name of Pero Martins claimed to have beheld the apparition of Our Lady in his dreams, cradling the Infant Jesus in her arms while holding a candle or a lantern. Subsequently, the devotion to Our Lady of Light began to spread, with Archbishop D. Afonso laying the foundation stone of the Church of Our Lady of Light in Carnide the following year, in the presence of King D. Afonso V and other members of the royal court.

The following year, a pilgrimage began at the end of summer, in September, marking the conclusion of the agricultural harvests. In the XVI century Infanta Maria, Duchess of Viseu sponsored the construction of several buildings in the area.

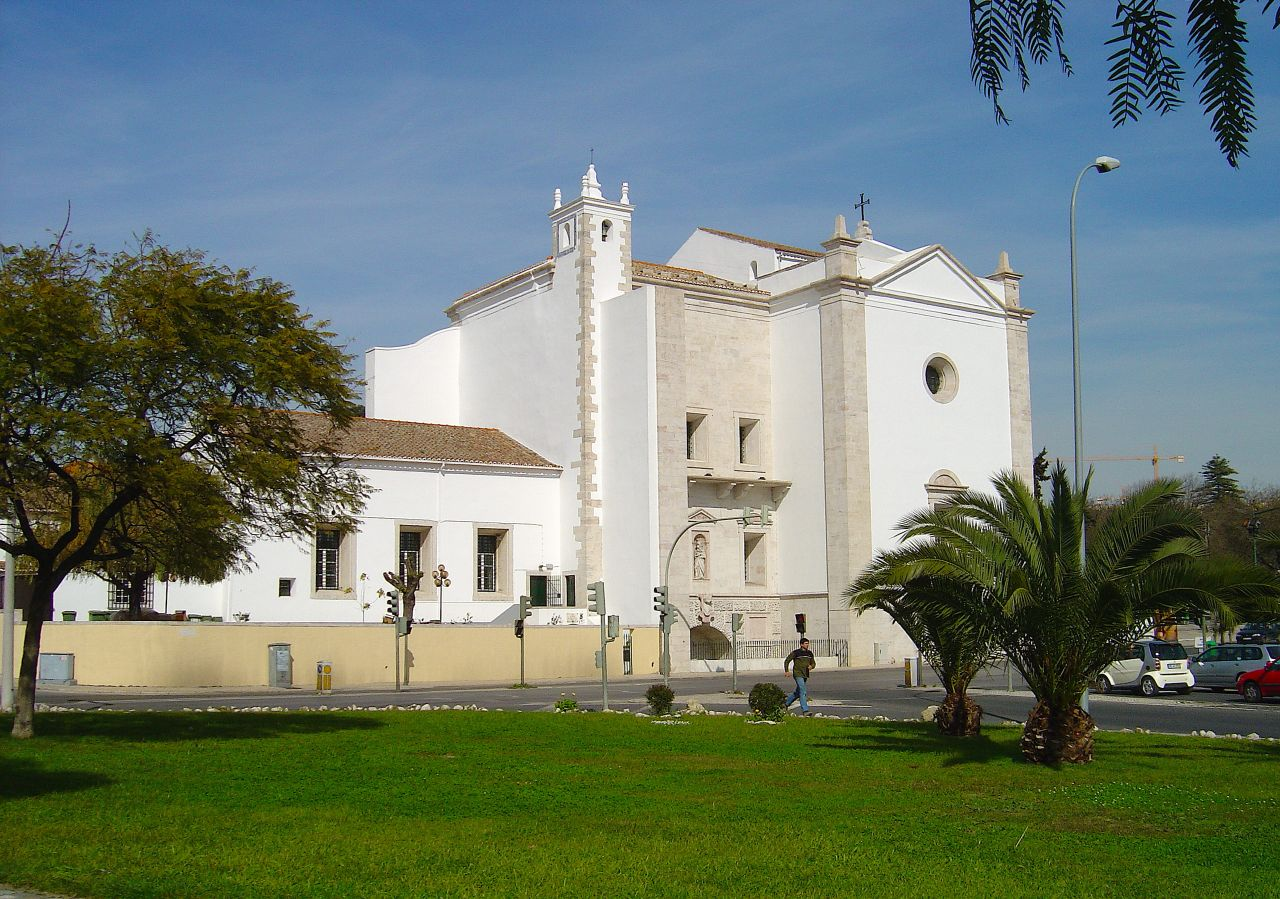
Nossa Senhora da Luz

In the XVI century in the parish was also active Spanish painter Francisco Venegas, whose works can still be found in the local church.

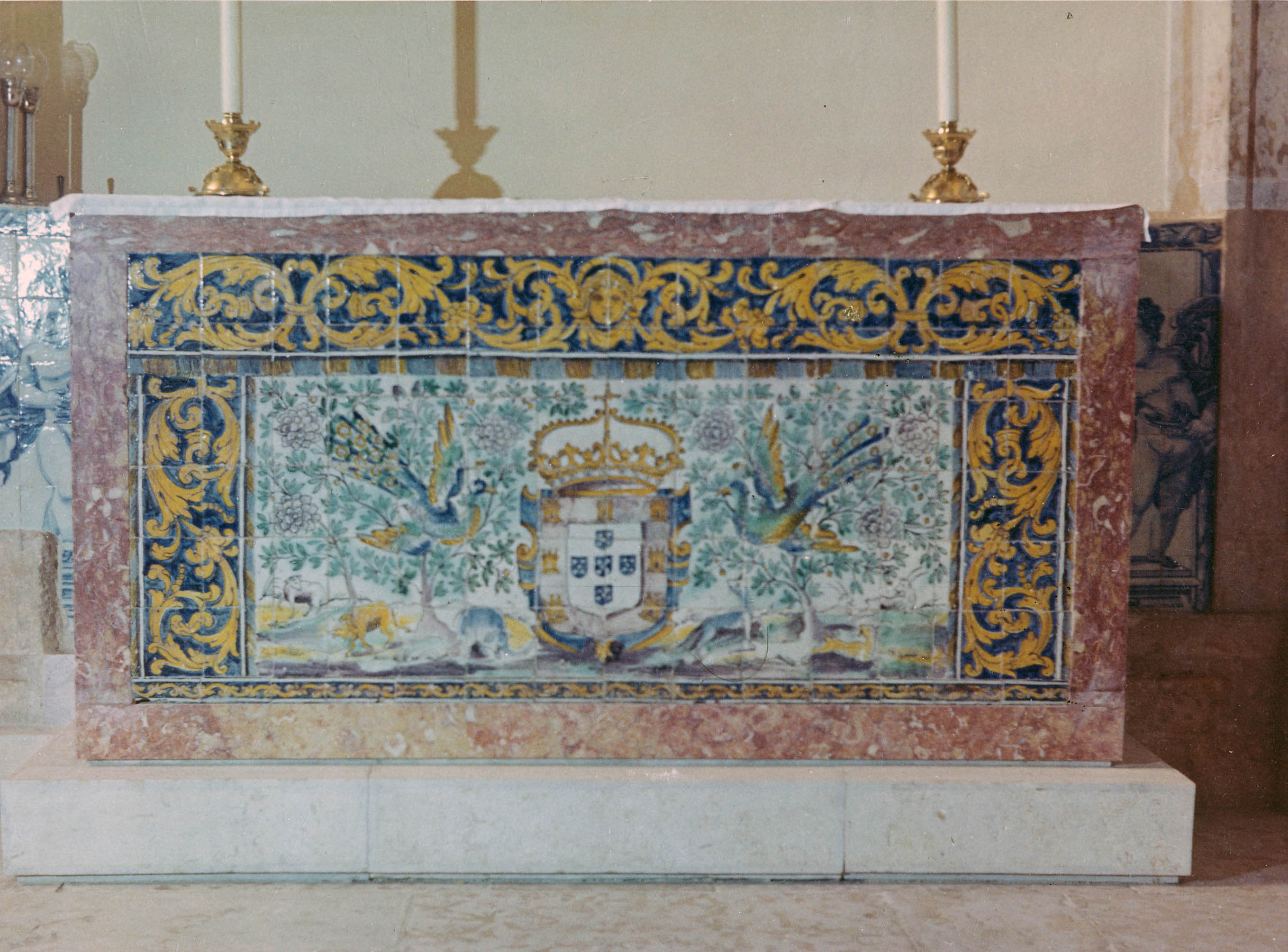
Altar in Santa Teresa convent

By the 18th century, the parish was essentially composed of two established nuclei, Carnide and Luz. In the 18th century, Luz served as a significant hub of attraction within the parish of Carnide. Large fairs and pilgrimages were held in the current Garden and Praça da Luz (Luz Square), drawing numerous visitors to the area during the summer months. The processions and pilgrimages of Nossa Senhora da Luz were grand events, attended even by the nobility. Members of the nobility-upper class linked to Carnide include both daughters of politician Hermano Braamcamp de Almeida Castelo Branco, who married in the parish, but also Luísa de Bragança, Duchess of Cadaval that with her aunt Maria of Braganza (natural daughter of John IV of Portugal) was raised in a Monastery in the area. It is worth noting that during the 18th century well-known painter-engraver Vieira Lusitano was also active in the area.

In 1852, the parish of Carnide was incorporated into the newly established municipality of Belém. Thirty-three years later, in 1885, it once again became part of the municipality of Lisbon. During this period, urban development works were carried out in the Praça da Luz (Luz Square), and improvements were made to the public roads in the parish. Under the old administrative division, it was part of the province of Estremadura.

=== Urbanization and new boundaries (1885–2012) ===
At the end of the 19th century, the construction of two ceramic factories in the outskirts of the settlements, along with the establishment of industrial units in neighboring parishes, invigorated the economy and encouraged laborers to settle in Carnide.

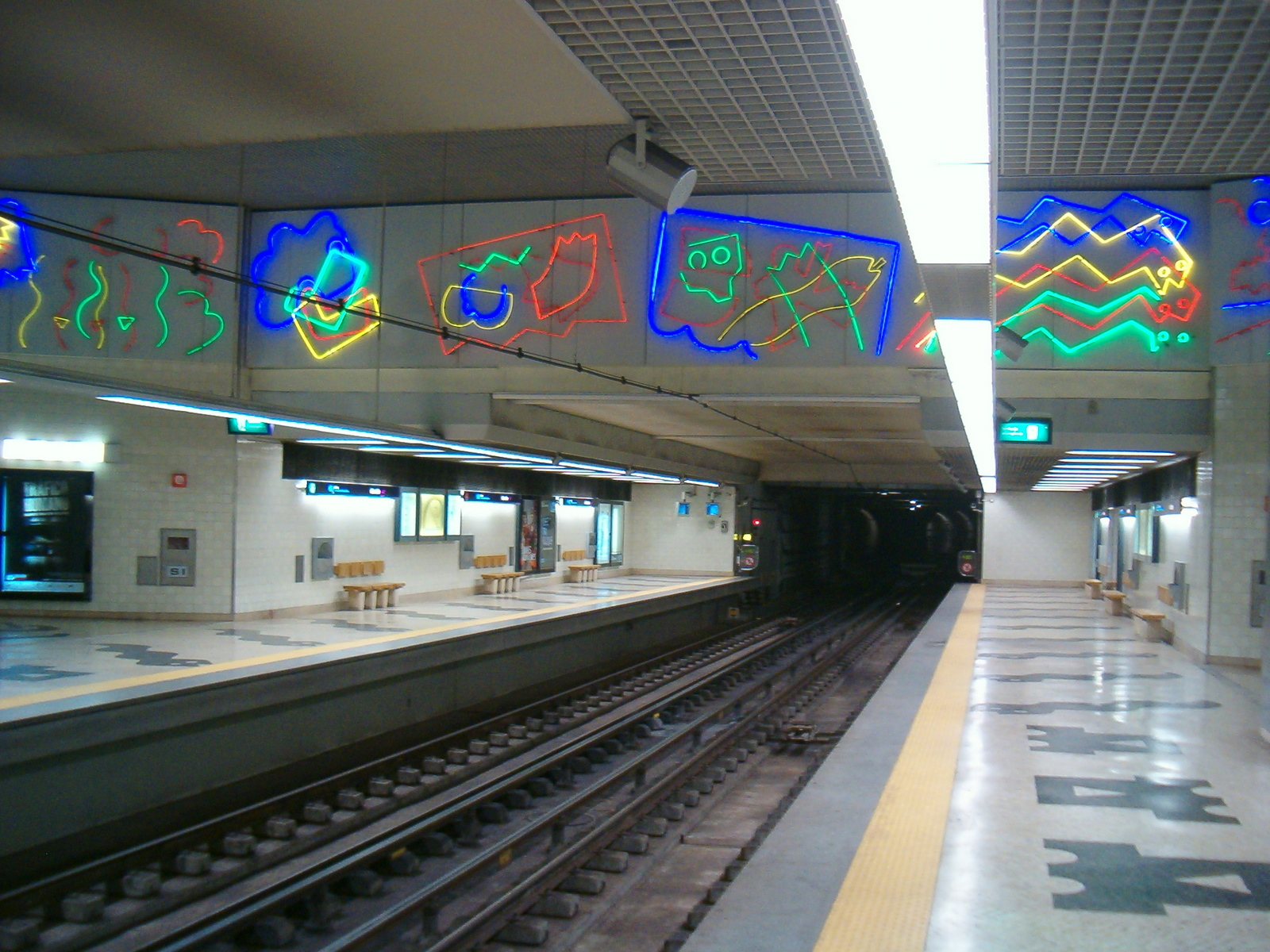
Carnide metro station

In the 20th century, agricultural practices, coupled with rural exodus, led to the abandonment of many estates. This, in turn, marked the commencement of intensive urbanization in the area. The once rural parish - in the beginning of the XX century there were still areas without electricity or tap water - became in the course of the XX century a highly urbanized area. Despite the buildings found nowadays, there are still reminiscences of its origins if the toponymy of the parish is taken into account. In fact, places such as "Azinhaga das Cerejeiras" or "Azinhaga dos Cerejais" recall the cherry trees once cultivated in the area or places such as "Azinhaga do serrado" (literally "narrow street with dense vegetation") or also "Azinhaga dos Lameiros" (literally "narrow street of the meadows") or Largo das Pimenteiras (literally "Pepper plant square") or even Largo do Malvar (literally "Mallow square") are clear reminders of the rural past of the parish. Other toponyms such as "Azinhaga das freiras" or "Azinhaga das Carmelitas" are, on the other hand, reminders of the convents once found in the parish.

Carnide had always been a parish where the aristocracy coexisted with the less privileged social strata. Nowadays, Carnide boasts both older and more contemporary districts. If the Carnide Historic centre houses around 1,300 people, while more than 6,000 live in Bairro Padre Cruz, one of the biggest social housing neighbourhoods in Europe. Its living conditions were also used as a background for Portuguese drama film Blood of My Blood.

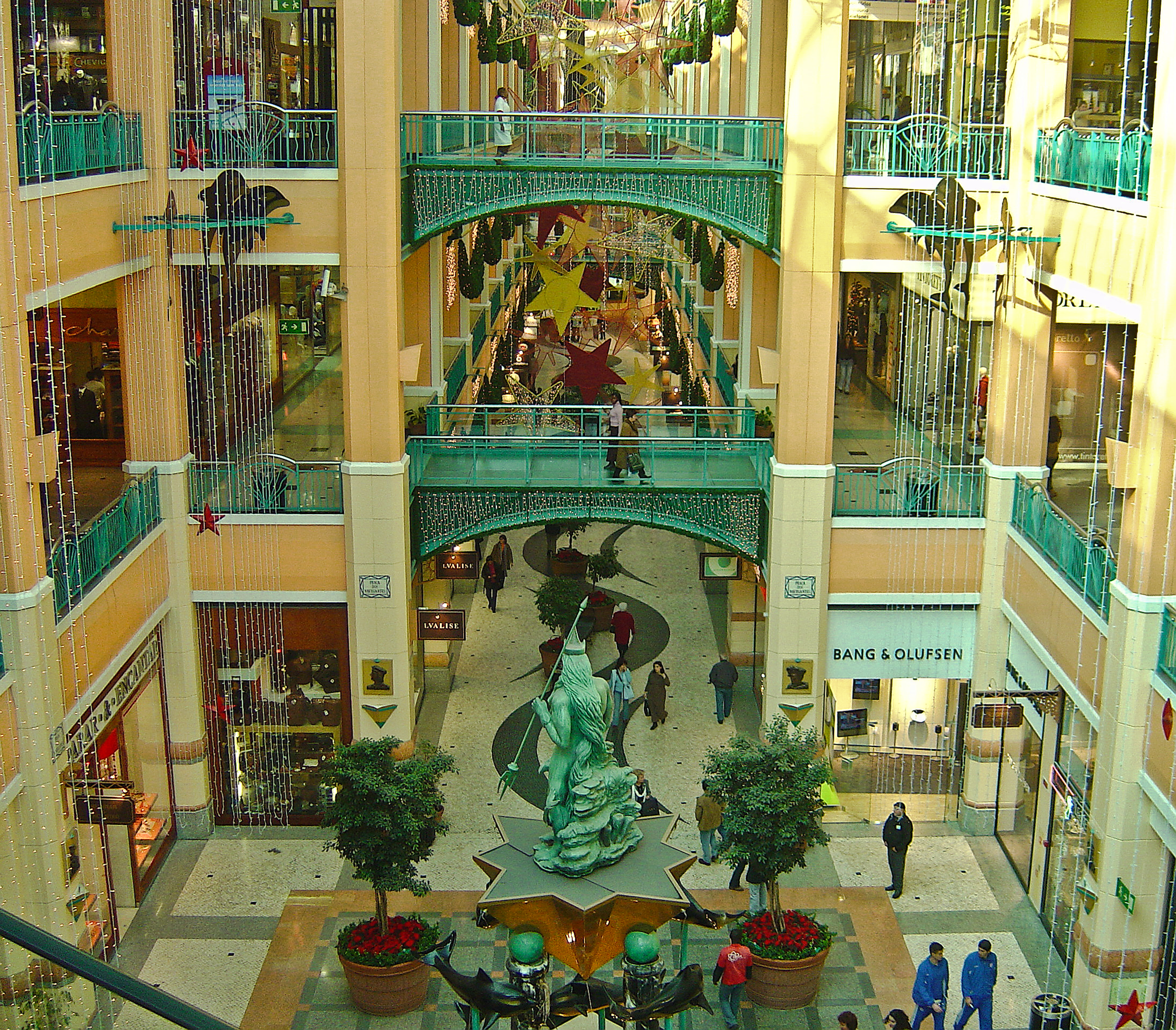
Colombo shopping mall

Relevant historical happenings include Teatro da Luz (Luz theatre) being established as Teatro Dom Luiz Filipe in 1903. Then, in 1913, Carnide Theatre (Teatro de Carnide) was established. Carnide Theatre, previously known as Carnide Dramatic Society, merged with the Carnide Theater Group, founded in 1953.

The urbanization of Bairro Padre Cruz occurred in 1959 while shortly after, in 1960, the Estádio Dr.Agostinho Lourenço was built. In 1962 the Bairro Padre Cruz Market was inaugurated, due to the reconversion of a building dating 1907. Currently (2023), the market is being extensively renovated. In the same year the market was inaugurated, the Our Lady of Fátima church (Igreja de Nossa Senhora de Fátima) was built as well.

The urbanization of Bairro da Horta Nova started in the 1970s. During the same time period a new building in Carnide - part of the larger "Quinta dos Condes de Carnide urban project" - was selected as the Valmor prize winner. Amongst known architects who worked in Carnide in the second half of the XX century there was also Jorge Ferreira Chaves.

In 1978 the Vergílio Ferreira Secondary School was erected where the Quinta dos Inglesesinhos, a community of Catholic Irish friars, once stood while the Carnide urbanization project was again awarded the Valmor Prize in 1985. Three years afterwards, the Colégio Militar/Luz metro station opened in 1988.

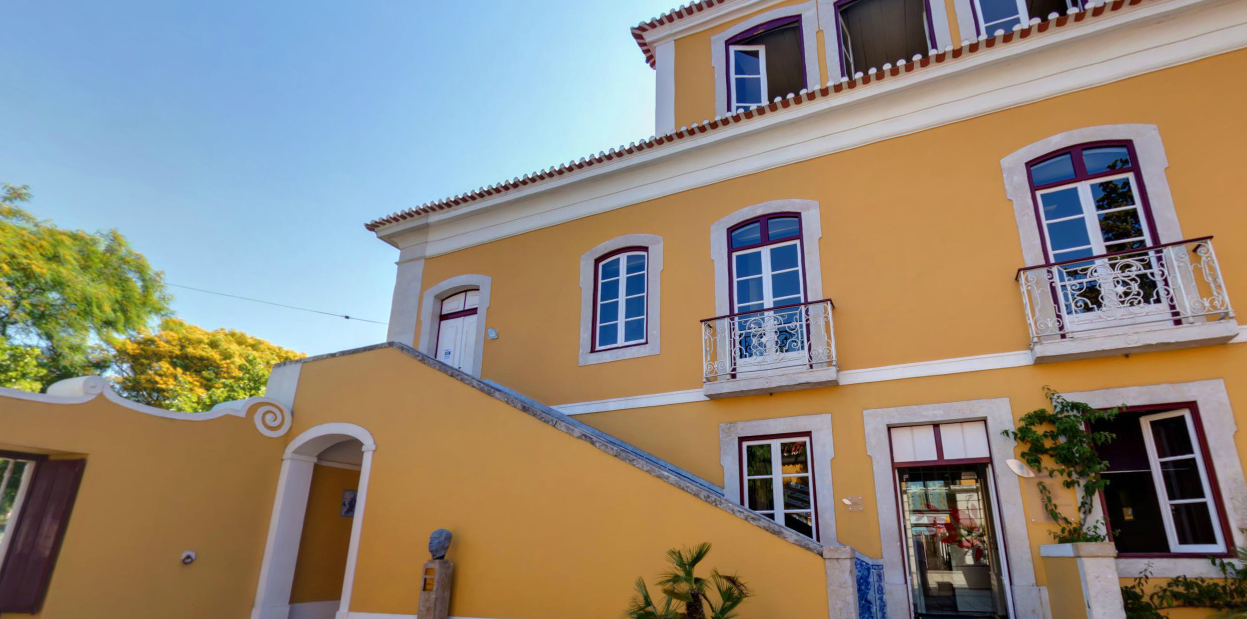
Universidade Europeia building in Carnide

During 1991-1996 two major works were inaugurated. Lispolis, a non-profit private association representing 126 enterprises and with a big campus in Carnide, and the Carnide Cemetery. Notable people buried here include poet Sophia de Mello Breyner Andresen

The Colombo shopping mall - that now employs around 5,500 people - was inaugurated in 1997. In the same year Carnide metro station and Pontinha metro station were opened to the public.

The inauguration of Casa do Artista-Apoiarte occurred in 1999 while in 2001 and 2003, respectively, the MFA Museum and the Armando Cortez theatre were opened (teatro Armando Cortez).

In 2004, two organizations were inaugurated. TIL-Teatro infantil de Lisboa, an association promoting theatre amongst kids since 1976, established its headquarters in Armando Cortez theatre, and the Luz Hospital (Hospital da Luz), the largest private hospital in Portugal and property of Luz Saúde group. In the same year, there was the requalification of Alameda Roentgen, now a green area with children's playgrounds and commercial activities.

The First Colombo tower (Torre Oriente) was completed in 2009. In the same year the Former Portuguese Design Centre building was awarded with the Valmor prize. Three years later - in 2011 - the Second Colombo tower (Torre Ocidente) was completed.

=== Infrastructure development (2012–present) ===
Following the Administrative Reform of civil parishes occurred in Portugal in 2012-2013, Carnide lost around 17.6% of its population to Lumiar and Benfica.

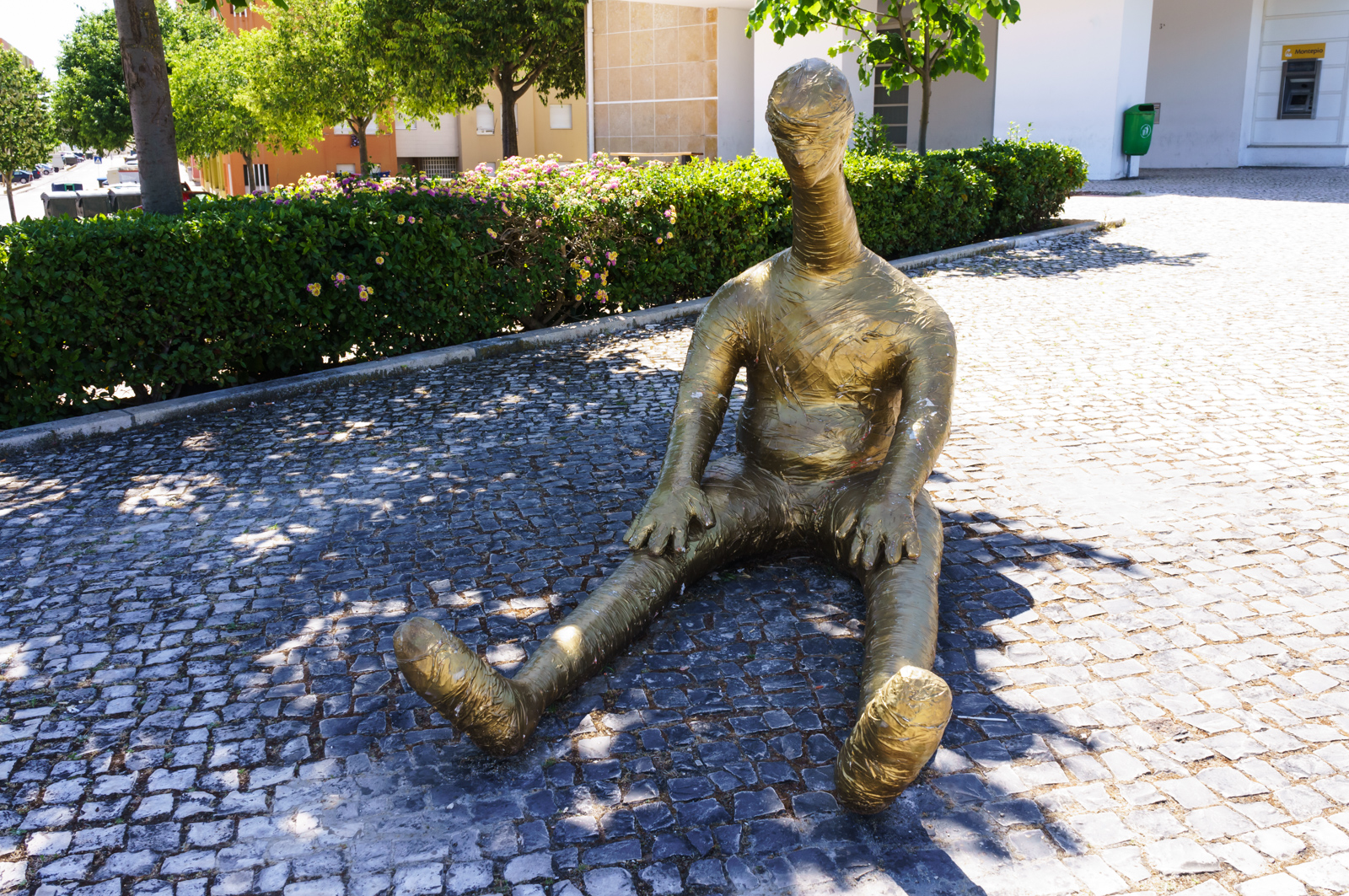
Art in Carnide

In 2013 Carnide was again mentioned during the Valmor prize for architecture ceremony thanks to its efforts in urbanizing Lispolis district.

Year 2015 saw the start of an ambitious project aimed at rehabilitating Bairro Padre Cruz neighbourhood, where around 6,100 people live, making it one of the biggest social housing neighbourhoods in Europe. By 2019, more than 300 houses had already been torn down and substituted by better accommodations. In 2020 the construction of other 100 brand new houses, as well as the demolition of old ones, was announced.

In 2016 Bairro Padre Cruz hosted a street art festival that provided the neighbourhood with more than 90 artworks, still visible today and now a major attraction in the parish.

In 2021 the Luz Hospital complex (private) became the first private university hospital in Portugal. In the same year, a major requalification of Bairro da Horta Nova (Horta Nova neighbourhood) occurred.

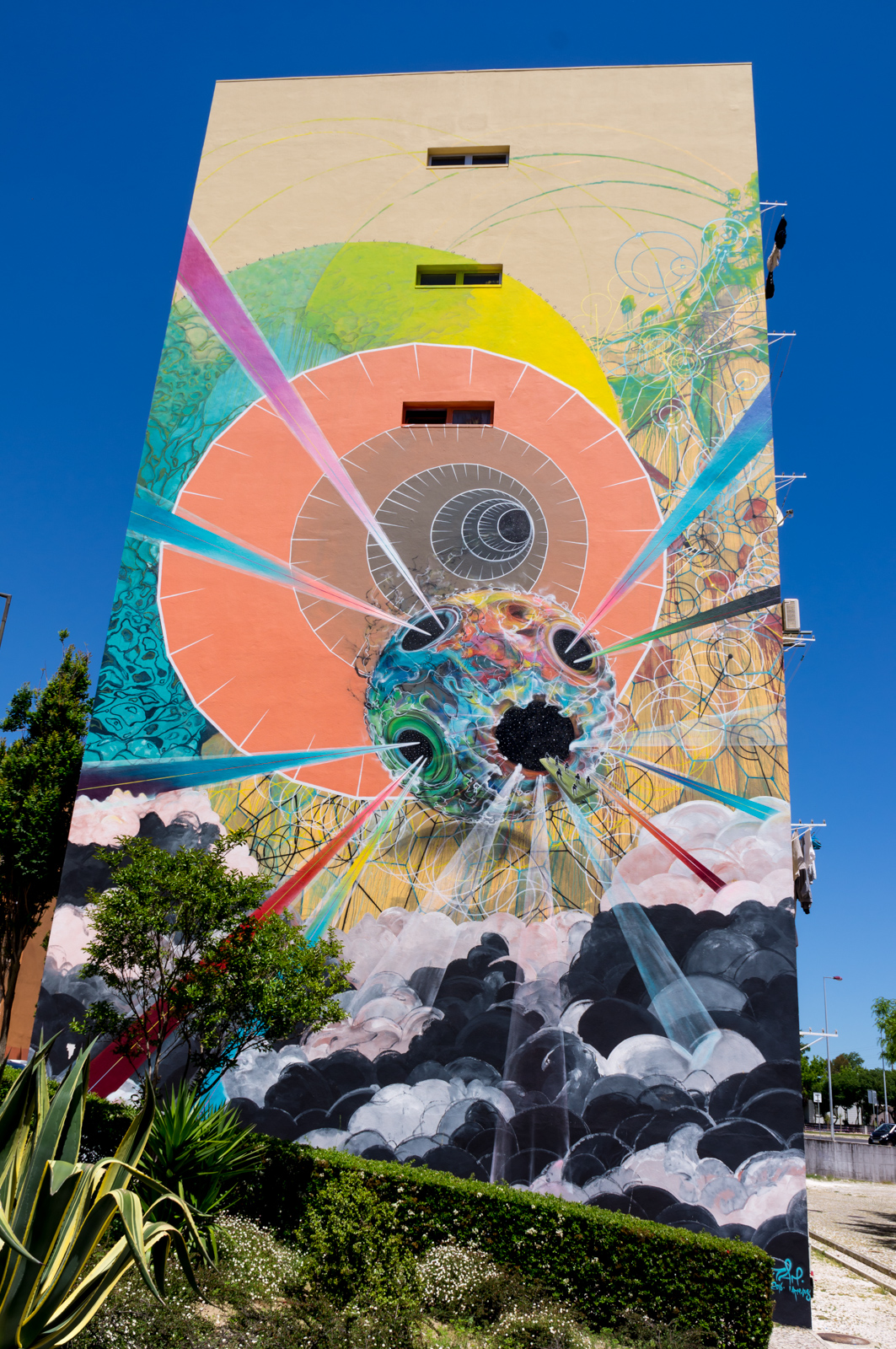
Street art in Carnide

Dealing with the development of Colombo shopping mall, in 2022 the construction of a third tower, as well as the further expansion of the mall, began. 2022 saw also the inauguration of a new municipal market (Mercado da Pontinha); although technically located within Carnide, it is administered by Odivelas municipality.

In the late 2010s and early 2020s many projects have been laid out for Carnide, aiming at enhancing the living conditions of those already living in the parish, attract new inhabitants and better the infrastructures as a whole; one of the latest projects completed is Duo Building, a residential unit opened in 2023.

Carnide, once a neglected parish, is now being revitalised also thanks to the contribution of numerous cultural associations located there including Natália Correia public library, Boutique da Cultura, Centro Cultural de Carnide, Centro Cultural Franciscano, Centro de Recursos DLBC Lisboa, Clube Atlético e Cultural (CAC), the Portuguese Federation of Automobilism and Karting, Instituto para o Desenvolvimento Social, Trokaki, Teatro da Luz, the Instituto Superior de Línguas e Administração library, Casa do Artista (Apoiarte) and the Portuguese Federation of Aeromodelism amongst others.

== Demographics ==
=== Historical resident population (before the 2012 Administrative Reform) ===
Historical population
Year	Pop.	±%
1864	1,278	—
1878	1,179	−7.7%
1890	1,737	+47.3%
1901	1,813	+4.4%
1911	1,740	−4.0%
1920	2,550	+46.6%
1930	2,482	−2.7%
1940	3,211	+29.4%
1950	3,351	+4.4%
1960	4,263	+27.2%
1971	8,736	+104.9%
1981	13,370	+53.0%
1991	14,768	+10.5%
2001	18,989	+28.6%
2011	23,316	+22.8%
2021	18,028	−22.7%
Source: INE

Adjustments, which took place in 2012, to the boundaries of the parish of Carnide

Between 1864 and 1878 it belonged to the extinct municipality of Belém. The limits were set by Law n.º 56/2012, of November 8.

In 1890, little after Carnide was incorporated into Lisbon, the total population stood at 1,737. In 1970, 80 years later, the population had grown to 8,736, recording a 402.9% growth rate.

The parish experienced continued growth in 1980 Census (when many people coming from the former Portuguese colonies in Africa - the so called retornados - moved to Portugal) up to 2011. From 1970 to 2011 Carnide gained 14,580 people, recording a 166.9% growth rate. The 2012 Portuguese administrative reform meant that the population recorded in 2011 fell from 23,316 to 19,218 (17.6% of the parish population) since parts of the parish were incorporated into neighbouring Benfica or Lumiar and thus adjusting the estimate to the new parish's limits.

=== Current resident population (after the 2012 Administrative Reform) ===
In the 2021 Portuguese Census was recorded a demographic loss. In particular, from 2011 to 2021 the parish lost 1,190 people, recording a loss of -6.19%.

Former Parishes			Current Parish		
Parish	Population (2011, adjusted to the new limits)	Area (km^{2})	Parish	Population in 2021	Area (km^{2})
Carnide (old)	19,218	3.69	Carnide (new)	18,028	3.69

=== Demographic statistics ===
- Age

The last censuses show that the parish's population is ageing at a fast pace: in 2021 31.06% of the population was below 25 and, at the same time, almost a quarter (23.68%) of the residents was 65 or older.

Distribution of Population by Age Groups
Year	0-14 Years	0-14 Years %	15-24 Years	15-24 Years %	25-64 Years	25-64 Years %	> 65 Years	> 65 Years %
2021	2,462	13.66%	2,008	11.58%	9,289	51.53%	4,269	23.68%

- Religion
Religion in Carnide (Census 2021)
1. Catholicism (72.3%)
2. Protestantism (2.14%)
3. Jehovah's Witnesses and Other Christian (1.49%)
4. Orthodoxy (0.46%)
5. Islam (0.47%)
6. Hinduism (0.22%)
7. Buddhism (0.15%)
8. Judaism (0.02%)
9. Other religions (0.32%)
10. No religion (22.3%)

The parish is predominantly catholic and 76.37% of the population aged 15 or above are followers of a Christian or Jeovah's Witness denomination as of 2021.

Interestingly, around 22.30% of the population doesn't practice a religion and is thus non religious.

The presence of minor religions such as Islam, Hinduism and Buddhism (1.18% of the population amongst the three) is probably due to an increasing community of people coming from India, Pakistan or Nepal.

- Immigration

In 2021, 4.76% of the population of the parish was constituted by foreigners. In particular, amongst women foreigners were 5.11% of the total. This means that in Carnide there are 859 resident foreigners, an increase from 2011, when there were 639 resident foreigners (3.33%). Since the foreign population increased by (correcting by new territorial area) 220 people from 2011 to 2021 and given that the total population of the parish decreased by 1,190 units in the same timespan, it is noteworthy that the demographic contraction was limited thanks to the increase in the number of resident foreigners, thus not counting people who have acquired Portuguese nationality in the meantime. The largest group of foreigners is constituted by PALOP countries' citizens (296 people or -13.2% since 2011), Brazilians (267 people or +108.59% since 2011), Spaniards (39 people or +8.33% since 2011), Italians (30 people or +328.57% since 2011) and people from the Indian Subcontinent, most notably Nepalis and Indians, totaling 28 people, or recording an increase of +1,300% since 2011.

Dealing with the foreign-born population, 11.34% of the parish's population was born abroad as of 2021. The most common countries of birth were PALOP countries (1,079 people), Brazil (398 people), France (78 people), Spain (48 people), Ukraine (45 people) and the Indian Subcontinent (44 people). Of the Portuguese nationals born abroad, the most common countries of birth were PALOP countries (839 people) and Brazil (131 people), all countries having ancient historical ties with Portugal as well as a rooted migration history towards the country, and who are, thus, more likely to have acquired Portuguese citizenship along the years.

Moreover, as of 2021 in the parish there were 1,292 people who have entered Portugal after 2010, constituting 7.17% of the population. Of those with recent migrant background, 22.45% were Portuguese nationals returning from a period of emigration abroad.

Amongst the Portuguese, 3,753 had already lived abroad as of 2021 (17.38% of the Portuguese population). The majority of those having lived in Angola and Mozambique (933 people) entered Portugal in the Seventies (575 people or 61.63%), following the independence of the two former colonies (so called retornados). Those coming from countries hosting large Portuguese emigrant communities such as France, Spain, Germany, Switzerland, Luxembourg or Belgium (514 people) have mostly entered Portugal after 1991 (73.35%), probably due to the development of the Portuguese economy since its accession to the EU. Interestingly, 45.45% of the Portuguese nationals having lived in the UK and residing in the parish, has left the UK after 2016, (date of the Brexit referendum).

If the whole population (regardless of the nationality held) is taken into account, then 18.69% of the parish's population has already lived abroad for at least one year as of 2021, with PALOP countries, Brazil and EU countries being the most commonly cited countries of previous residence.

== Economy and Social conditions ==
=== Employment ===
In the parish of Carnide there are 718 residents who, as of 2021, were unemployed. Of these, 38.44% received a state-fund subsidy or pension (41.34% in Lisbon). In 2021 the unemployment rate in the parish is slightly higher than the one recorded for Lisbon and for Portugal as a whole, standing at 8.63%. In the same year, Portugal as a whole had an unemployment rate of 8.13% that has progressively decreased to 6.1% in 2023. As the statistics dealing with unemployment at the parish level are available only every 10 years, the current (2023) unemployment rate in Carnide is unknown. Amongst youth aged 15–24 the unemployment rate in 2021 in the parish stood at 22.83%, 22.22% higher than in the rest of the country.

On the other hand, in 2021 7,604 residents were employed, of which 79.68% were employees and 18.10% were independent workers. Below is the table showing the employment rate per age group. The low share of people aged 20–24 employed is due to the fact that many are still in education (e.g. university) while the low proportion of those in employment aged 60–64 is due to many being early pensioners.

2021 Census data	Age group								
2021 Census data	20-24	25-29	30-34	35-39	40-44	45-49	50-54	55-59	60-64
Share of people in employment	32.95%	70.26%	77.55%	79.31%	78.44%	81.12%	78.62%	71.63%	55.45%

Dealing with commuting, the residents of Carnide spent 22.57 minutes of daily commuting, slightly more than the average inhabitant of Lisbon.

=== Social conditions ===
Dealing with overcrowding in the parish's households, 9.73% of the population lives in accommodations where they have less than 15 m^{2} per capita (8.71% for Lisbon and 5.65% in Portugal as a whole), while 37.89% live in houses with more than 40 m^{2} per capita (39.64% for Lisbon and 46.84% in Portugal as a whole). There are 2,445 dwellings per km^{2} (3,200.5 for Lisbon and 64.9 in Portugal as a whole).

57.9% of the population lives in owned dwellings as of 2021; this is higher than the value recorded for Lisbon (50.3%) but significantly lower than the one recorded for Portugal (70%). The average height of a residential building in Carnide is 3.5 floors as of 2021 and the average area of a dwelling stands at 95.59 m^{2} (with the average in Lisbon-city 93.07 m^{2} being and in Portugal 112.45 m^{2}).

The average monthly rent value of leased dwellings recorded in 2021 stood at €289.33, 38.55% lower than the Lisbon average in the same year (€470.87). It is nonetheless important to notice that the value of the rents is quite low because of many contracts stipulated decades ago, with 54.94% (25.34% in Lisbon) of the dwellers paying less than €150/month because of the rent-freezing system that was adopted in Portugal in the late XX century, allowing that many people, now mostly elders, don't have to pay high rents. Due to the housing crisis and inflation, in 2023 the average rent for new contracts (frozen contracts aren't concerned) stood in fact at €14/m^{2} in Carnide, meaning that for the average 95.59 m^{2} dwelling are necessary around €1,338/month.

Dealing with housing prices, it is interesting to remark that if the median price per m^{2} stood at €2,050 for a house sold in early 2016, this value had risen to €3,416/m^{2} in early 2021 and to €4,162/m^{2} in 2023, experiencing a growth of +103.02% in just 7 years. In the same period the growth of house priced per m^{2} in Lisbon as a whole was +117.6%, from €1,875/m^{2} to €4,080/m^{2}.

Of the 1,383 residential buildings listed in the parish, 9.62% were built before 1919, 36.30% from 1919 to 1960, 32.25% from 1961 to 1990, 15.33% from 1991 to 2000 and 6.51% after 2001. Of the buildings built before 1919 100% had 1 to 3 floors, while in buildings built between 1981 and 2010 the proportion of buildings with 6 stories or more is 49.82%. Interestingly, the newer and higher the building the higher the probability of it being served by an elevator. For homes built before 1946, 0% have access to an elevator as of 2021; this percentage ascends to 68.55% for buildings dating from 1981 to 2010. Always with regard to amenities, 23.50% of the houses had access to air conditioning (20.98% in Lisbon), 69.39% to heating (69.62% in Lisbon) and 49.61% to a parking place (28.04% in Lisbon).

As of 2021 there were 831 vacant dwelling in the parish. Of the vacant dwellings, 297 are vacant for rental or with the purpose of being sold, while 534 are vacant for other reasons, often abandoned, awaiting their demolition or because a reason for conflict among heirs. Moreover, as of 2023 39 apartments are registered as "Alojamento Local", meaning they have the license to be rent on platforms such as Booking.com or Airbnb.

In the parish were also recorded 50 homeless people, of which 48 (96%) were males. The parish is thus actively promoting initiatives aiming at helping people in situation of permanent of temporal homelessness.

== Landmarks ==
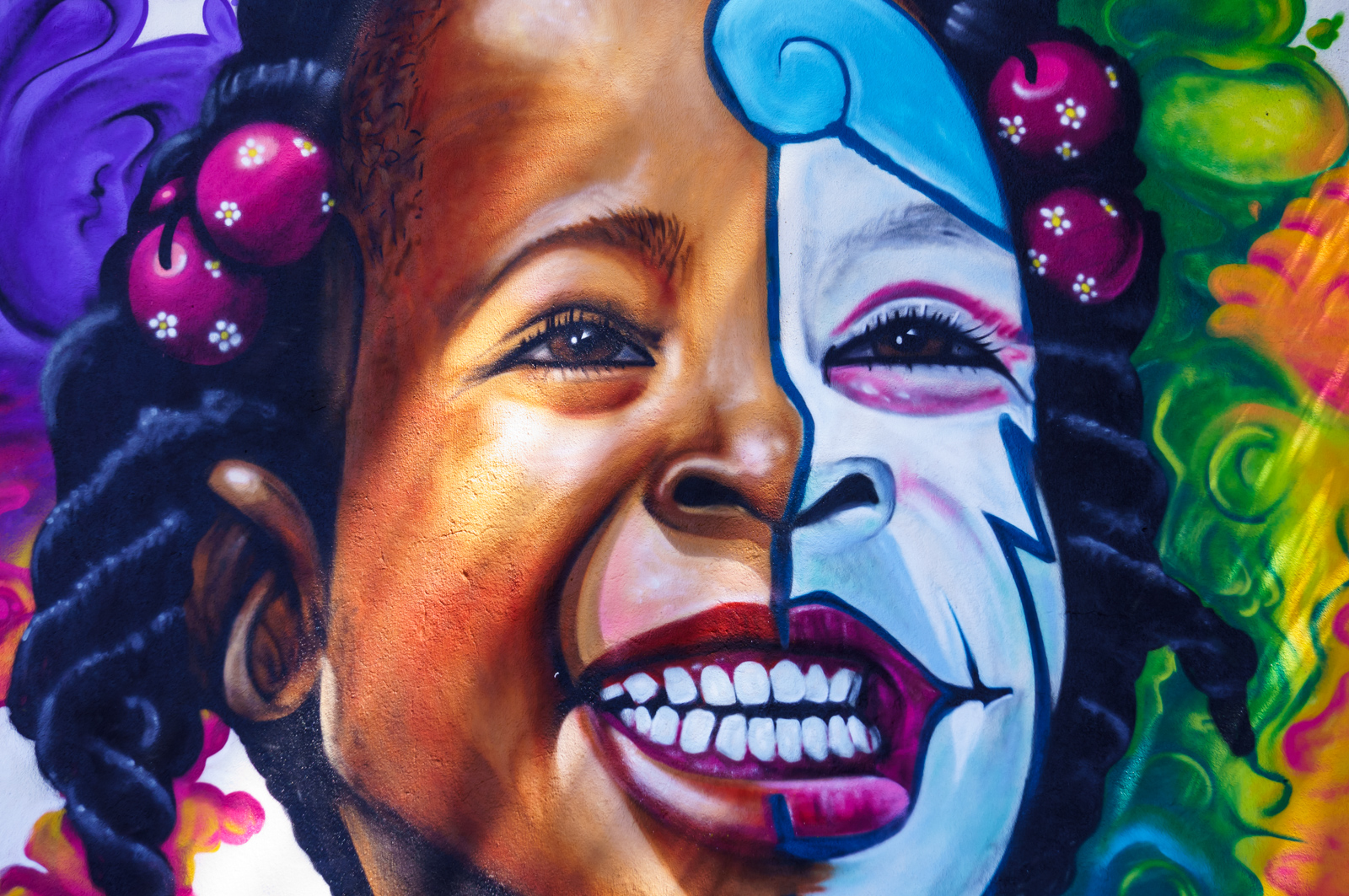
Street art in Carnide

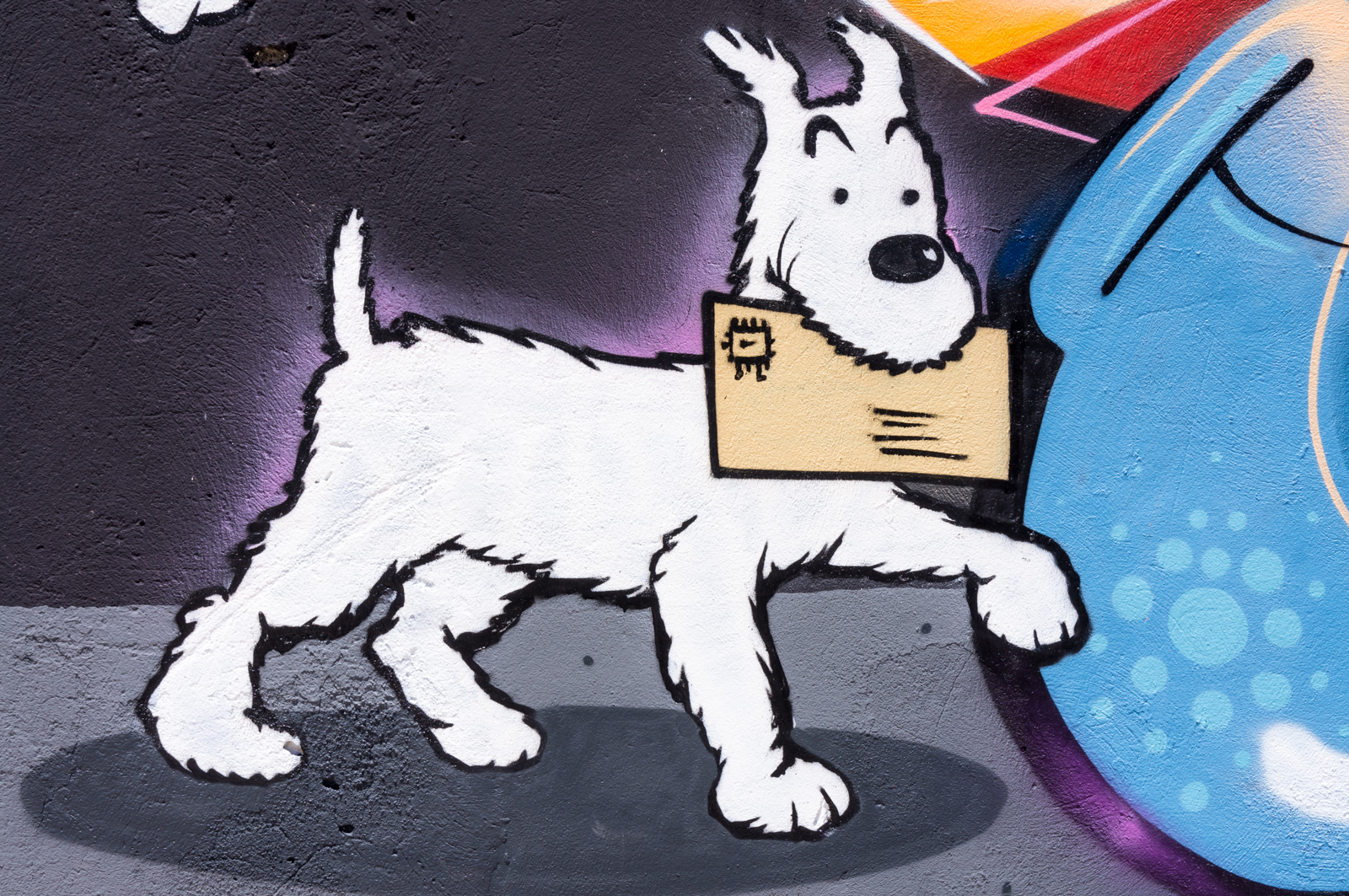
Street art in Carnide

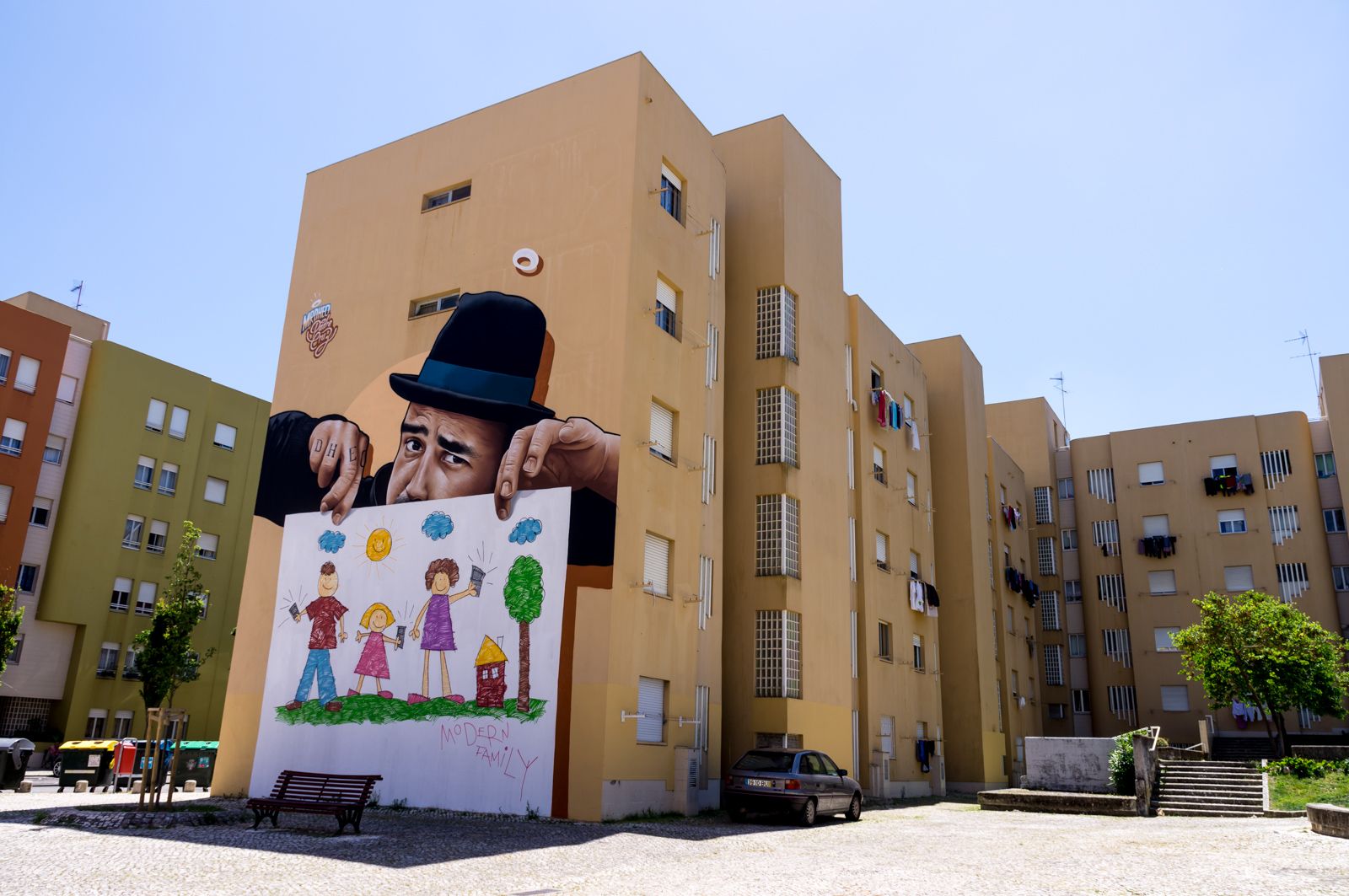
Street art in Carnide

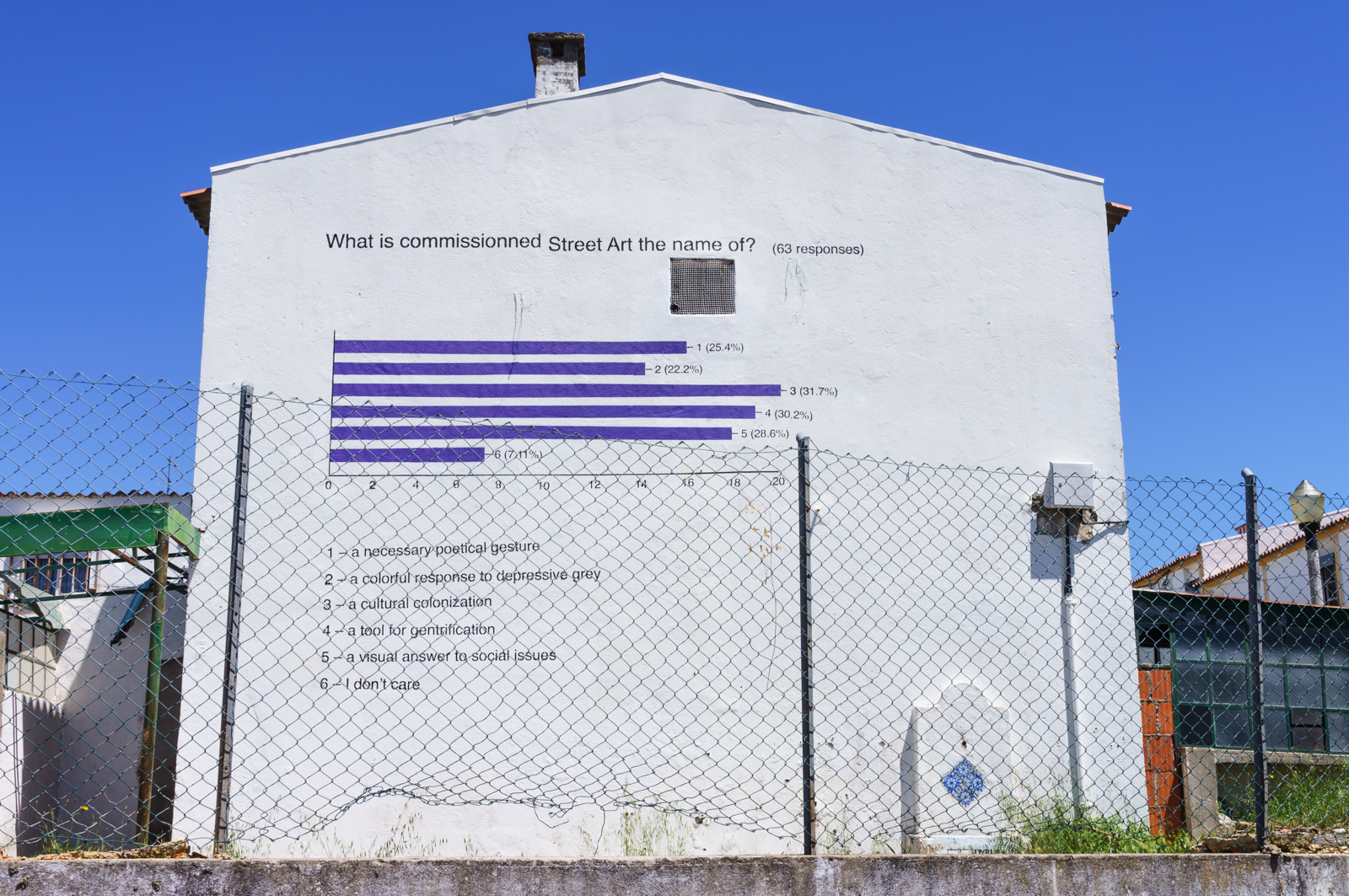
Street art in Carnide

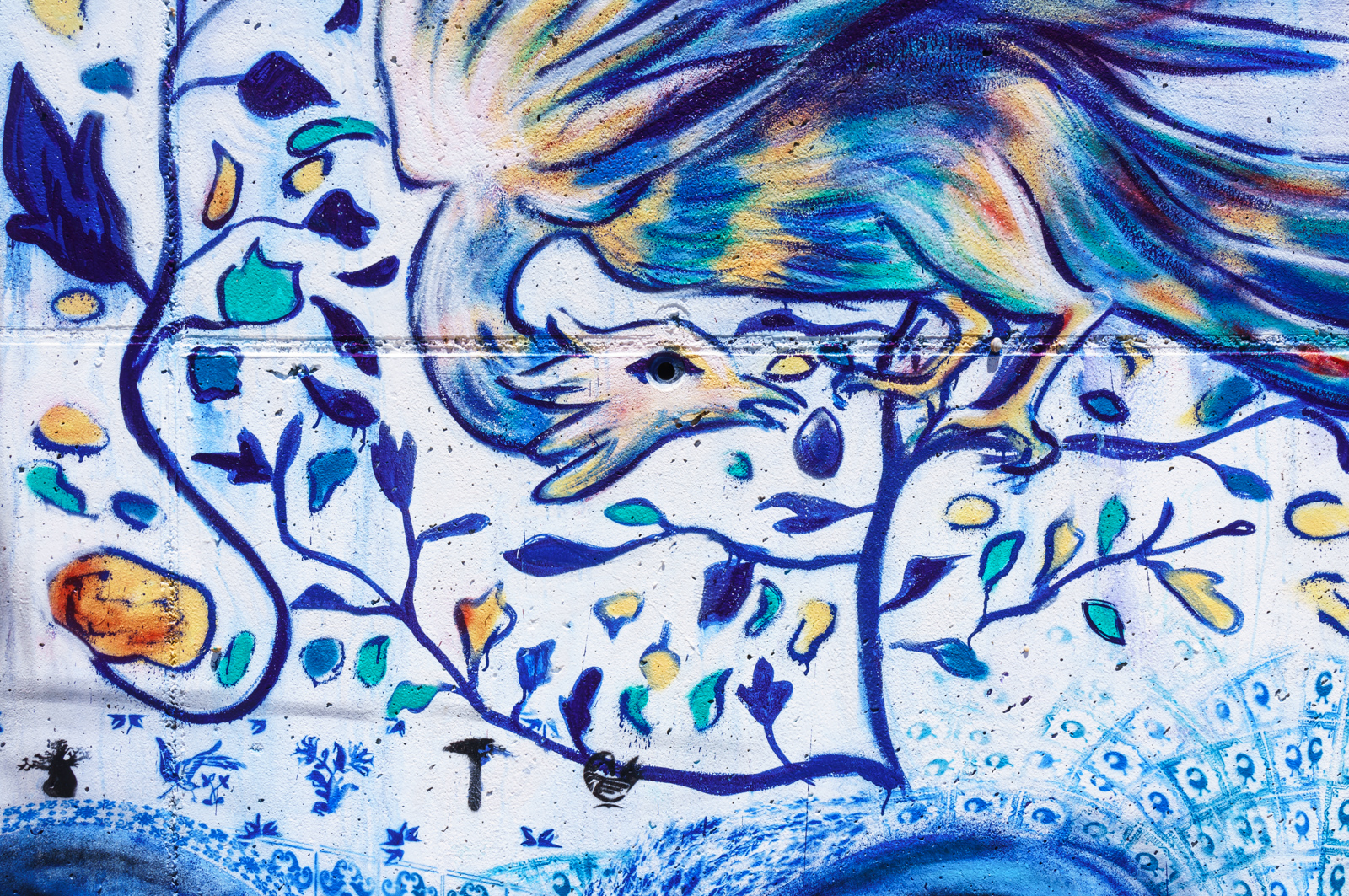
Street art in Carnide

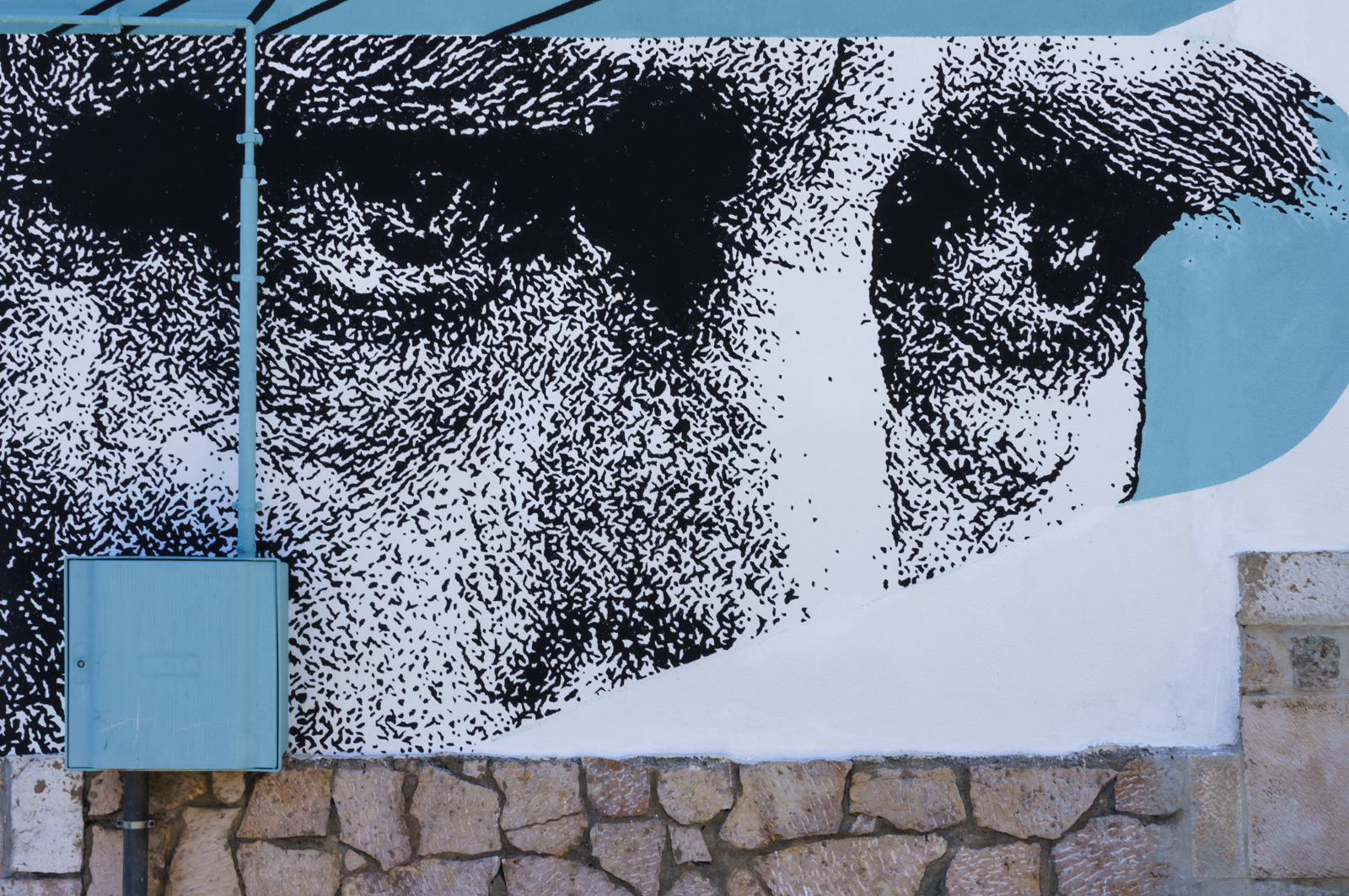
Street art in Carnide

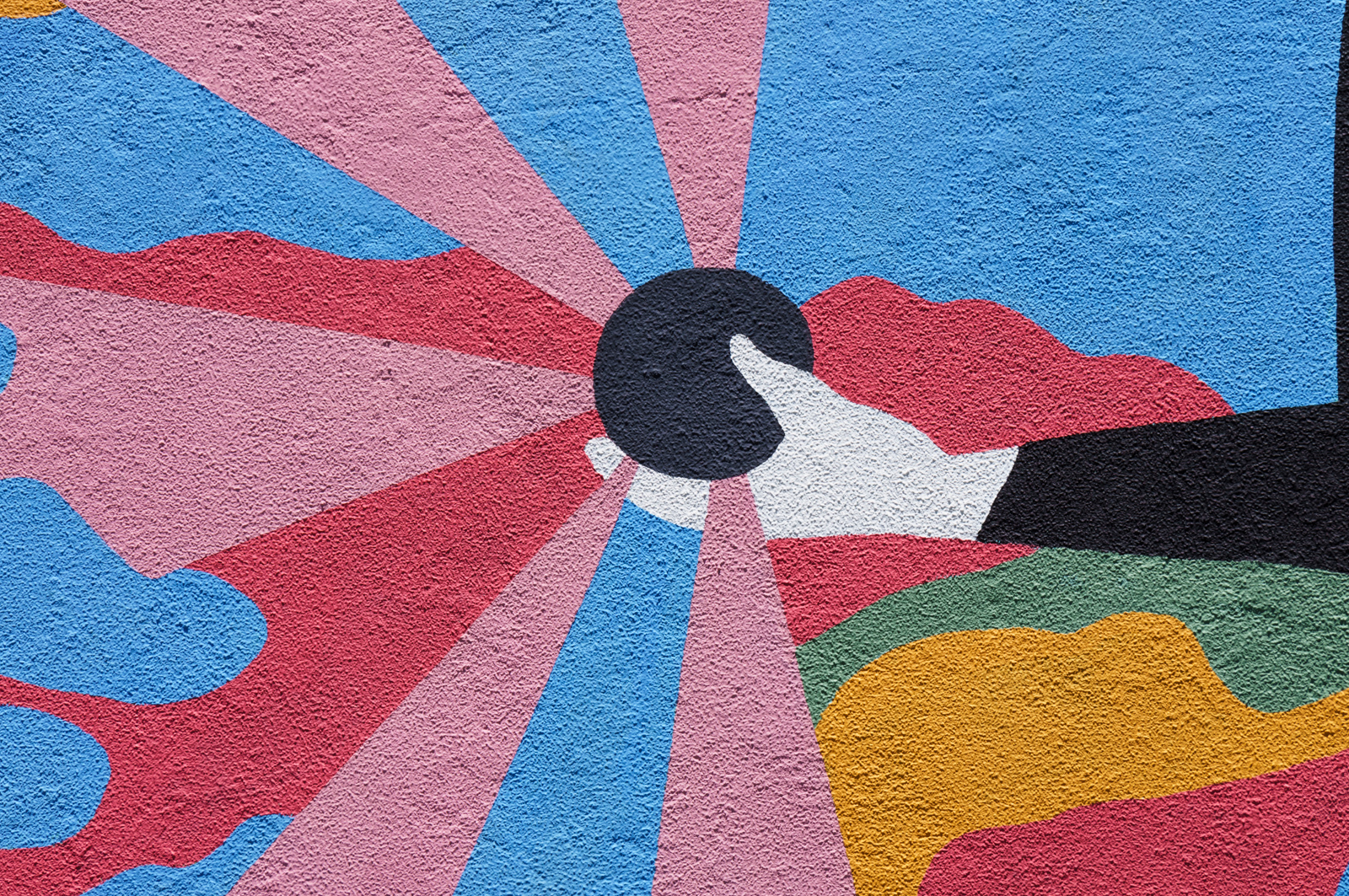
Street art in Carnide

- Bairro Padre Cruz street art: there are more than 90 artworks scattered through this neighborhood, that hosted a street art festival in 2016.
- Busto de D. António Francisco Marques: A sculpture inaugurated in 2019. It is dedicated to the first bishop of Santarém.
- Busto do Padre Francisco da cruz: A sculpture by Joaquim Martins Correia dating from 1967.
- Carnide Historic centre (Zona antiga de Carnide)
- Casa da Quinta do Bom Nome: Historic building from the XVIII century, now home to European University (Portuguese: Universidade Europeia, abbr.: UE), a private university established in 2011 with around 2,300 students. It is a notable estate boasting a well-preserved eighteenth-century residence. Classified as a Public Interest Property, it underwent renovations in the nineteenth and twenty-first centuries. Its L-shaped layout includes a chapel and main house, featuring intricate tile decorations depicting flora, fauna, and hunting scenes. Access is through a courtyard gate, with external stairs leading to the noble floor.
- Chafariz da Luz, also known as Chafariz da fonte: Historic public fountain
- Chafariz do Largo das Pimenteiras
- Chafariz do Malvar (also known as Chafariz de Carnide): Public fountain dated 1857
- Colégio Militar: Military high school founded in 1803 boasting multiple statues of artistic value and notable azulejos
- Colombo Centre: Second largest shopping mall in Portugal. The mall has 119 725 m^{2} and 340 stores
- Santa Teresa de Jesus de Carnide Convent: Convent founded in 1642 by Micaela Margarida de Sant'Ana, daughter of the emperor Matthias of the Holy Roman Empire and John IV's niece to house Carmelite nuns. Infanta Maria oversaw its completion, adorning the convent and church (1663-1667).
- Coreto de Carnide: Bandstand dated 1929. It stands in the historical centre of Carnide.
- Igreja de Nossa Senhora da Luz: Church from the XVI century. Built in 1870 by architect Valentim Correia, the facade houses a remarkable interior with a marble-decorated chapel, a simple sepulcher for Infanta D. Maria (daughter of Manuel I), a splendid gilded wood altarpiece by Francisco Venegas and Diogo Teixeira, and wooden altarpieces depicting scenes like the Circumcision, Flight into Egypt, and Saint Benedict delivering the Rule. In the church's southern section, remnants of an ancient chapel from 1463/64, including a Manueline arch and Hispano-Arabic tiles, can be found.
- Igreja de Nossa Senhora da Imaculada Conceição, also known as Igreja Franciscana do Seminário da Luz: Church inaugurated in 1967
- Igreja de Nossa Senhora de Fátima (Our Lady of Fátima church): Church inaugurated in 1962 in Bairro Padre Cruz
- Igreja de São Lourenço de Carnide: In 1342, the Bishop of Lisbon, D. João, commissioned the construction of the church in honor of S. Lourenço by Pedro Sanches, chanter of his see, and gave it to his chaplain João Dor. It was already a parish church in the fourteenth century. Amidst a spacious walled courtyard lined with olive trees, offering a wide view of fields and hills, stands the church with its bell tower, in lines of simple construction. The orientation and layout of the church are ancient, yet little remains of its original state.
- Miradouro da Serra da Luz: An elevated viewpoint on Oeiras and Odivelas
- Museu do do Posto de Comando do MFA: Inaugurated in 2001, it is a museum dedicated to the Portuguese Armed forces located where the Carnation Revolution started. The access is made from Odivelas and the museum is managed by Odivelas municipality.
- Palácio dos Condes de Carnide: a XVIII century palace, who suffered major interventions during 1750 - 1775
- Statue "Cidade Imaginária": A sculpture by Charters de Almeida inaugurated in 2001, in a roundabout at the entrance of Lispolis Parque Poente.
- Statue "Escultura de Carlos Seixas": A sculpture by Euclides Vaz dated 1972
- Statue "Monumento ao Colégio Militar": A monument erected in 1932 by Pero Pinheiro
- Teatro Armando Cortez and Casa do Artista: Established in 1999 by actors Armando Cortez and Raul Solnado, Casa do Artista aims to provide residence for entertainment professionals, featuring the Armando Cortez Theatre, Training Center, Multipurpose Spaces, and Raul Sonado Gallery. Teatro Cortez performance venue, opened in May 2003, was named in tribute to actor Armando Cortez (1928-2002). Hosting theater, dance, music, and events like seminars, conferences, with a seating capacity of 300
- Troço da Muralha de Circunvalação de Lisboa: ruins of ancient Lisbon walls, visible from Rua principal, 195, Odivelas. A section around 340 meters long lies in Carnide.

== Sport ==
The neighborhood has many sports facilities, among them the Dr. Agostinho Lourenço Stadium, which hosts the neighborhood's main football team, Unidos de Lisboa.

== Health ==
In Carnide there is the seat of Hospital da Luz, one of the largest hospitals found in Lisbon. Hospital da Luz received the 2007 Valmor Prize for its technological innovation. Manuel Salgado is the architect responsible for the hospital project (made from a functional program developed by the Catalan Albert Pineda).

== Gardens and parks ==
Carnide hosts several public gardens, often hosting playgrounds or public workout facilities. These include Jardim Bento Martins (with playground), Jardim da Alameda Roentgen (with playground, skatepark and outdoor gym), Jardim Teixeira Rebelo (or Jardim do Largo da Luz, hosting two little lakes), Jardim Ferreira de Mira, Parque Poetas de Abril, Jardim Adão Barata, and Parque Hortícola da Quinta das Carmelitas.

In recent years there has been a constant investment towards public facilities such as children playgrounds, with many created alongside the development of the parish.

== Politics ==
=== List of Junta de freguesia presidents ===
#	Name	Party	Time in office
1	Serafim Eiras	PS	1976-1979
2	Maria Fernanda Antunes (renounced)	AD (PSD-CDS-PPM)	1979-1982*
2	Manuel da Silva	AD (PSD-CDS-PPM)	1979-1982
3	Maria Vilar Diógenes	PCP	1982-1985 1985-1989 1989-1993
4	Adão Barata	PCP-PS	1994-1997
5	José Araújo	PCP-PS	1997-2001
6	Paulo Quaresma	PCP-PS-CDU (PCP-PEV)	2001-2005 2005-2009 2009-2013
7	Fábio Sousa	CDU (PCP-PEV)	2013-2017 2017-2021 2021-now

=== Local elections ===
Election	%	M	%	M	%	M	%	M	%	M	%	M	%	M	%	M	%	M	%	M	%	M	%	M	%	M
Election	PS		APU/CDU		GDUPs		PPD/PSD		CDS/PP		PCTP/MRPP		AD		PS/CDU		PSD/CDS		BE		IND		CH		IL	
1976	39.10	6			10.40	1	12.30	1	12.00	1	2.79	-									16.20	2				
1979																										
1982	31.10	6	34.20	7							1.07	-	29.60	6												
1985	18.70	2	42.20	6			33.90	5			2.06	-														
1989											3.84	-			62.50	9	30.9	4								
1993							25.50	3	6.90	1	4.60	1			61.40	9										
1997											5.92	1			59.30	8	34.3	5								
2001							36.30	5	8.90	1	2.95	-			46.10	7			4.70	-						
2005	24.20	3	35.40	5			25.50	4	4.30	-	3.70	-							6.20	1						
2009	25.60	3	40.80	6							2.03	-					25.80	4	4.90	-						
2013	23.80	4	46.10	7							3.75	-					16.60	2	3.60	-						
2017	22.60	3	44.80	7			13.40	2	9.10	1	1.75	-							5.30	-						
2021	18.30	3	45.50	7													20.10	3	4.50	-			3.90	-	3.80	-
Source: Comissão Nacional de Eleições

== Notable people ==
- Estêvão da Ordem de Cristo (1500s): Portuguese religious composer of plainchant in the Renaissance period
- Maria of Portugal, Duchess of Viseu (1521-1577): In 1594 sponsored the construction of a church in the parish
- Fernando de Almeida (composer) (1603-1660): Portuguese Baroque composer
- Maria Josefa de Bragança (1644-1693): Patroness of the Convent of Santa Teresa de Jesus de Carnide
- José Maria das Neves Costa (1774-1841): Portuguese general officer of the Royal Corps of Engineers of the Portuguese Army who stood out for his brilliant and innovative works on military cartography
- Hermano José Braamcamp de Almeida Castelo Branco (1775-1846): Portuguese nobleman and politician
- António da Silva Túlio (1818-1884): Portuguese writer and historian
- Rodrigo Paganino (1835-1863): Portuguese doctor, writer, translator and journalist
- Francisco de Borja de Sousa Holstein (1838-1878): Portuguese diplomat, politician, lawyer and academic
- Linda Silva (1942-2011): Portuguese actress
- Fernando Jorge Amoreira Fernandes (1957): Portuguese court officer
- Pedro Madeira Rodrigues (1971): Portuguese businessman, politician, philanthropist and sports leader

Connected with Carnide there were also the noble titles of Visconde de Carnide and Conde de Carnide, both created in the XIX century. The titles ceased to exist once the country became a republic.

== Streets ==
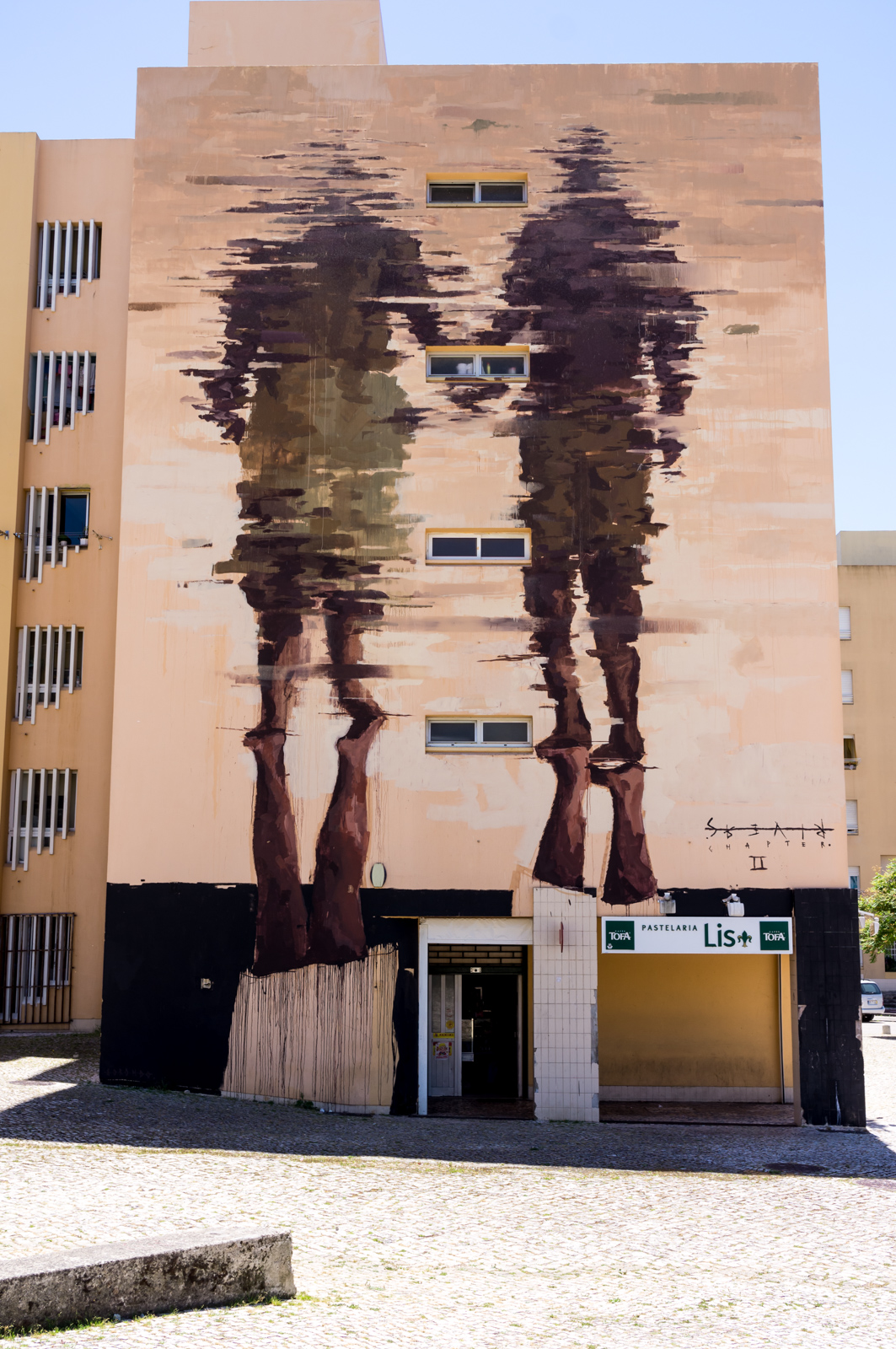
Street art in Carnide

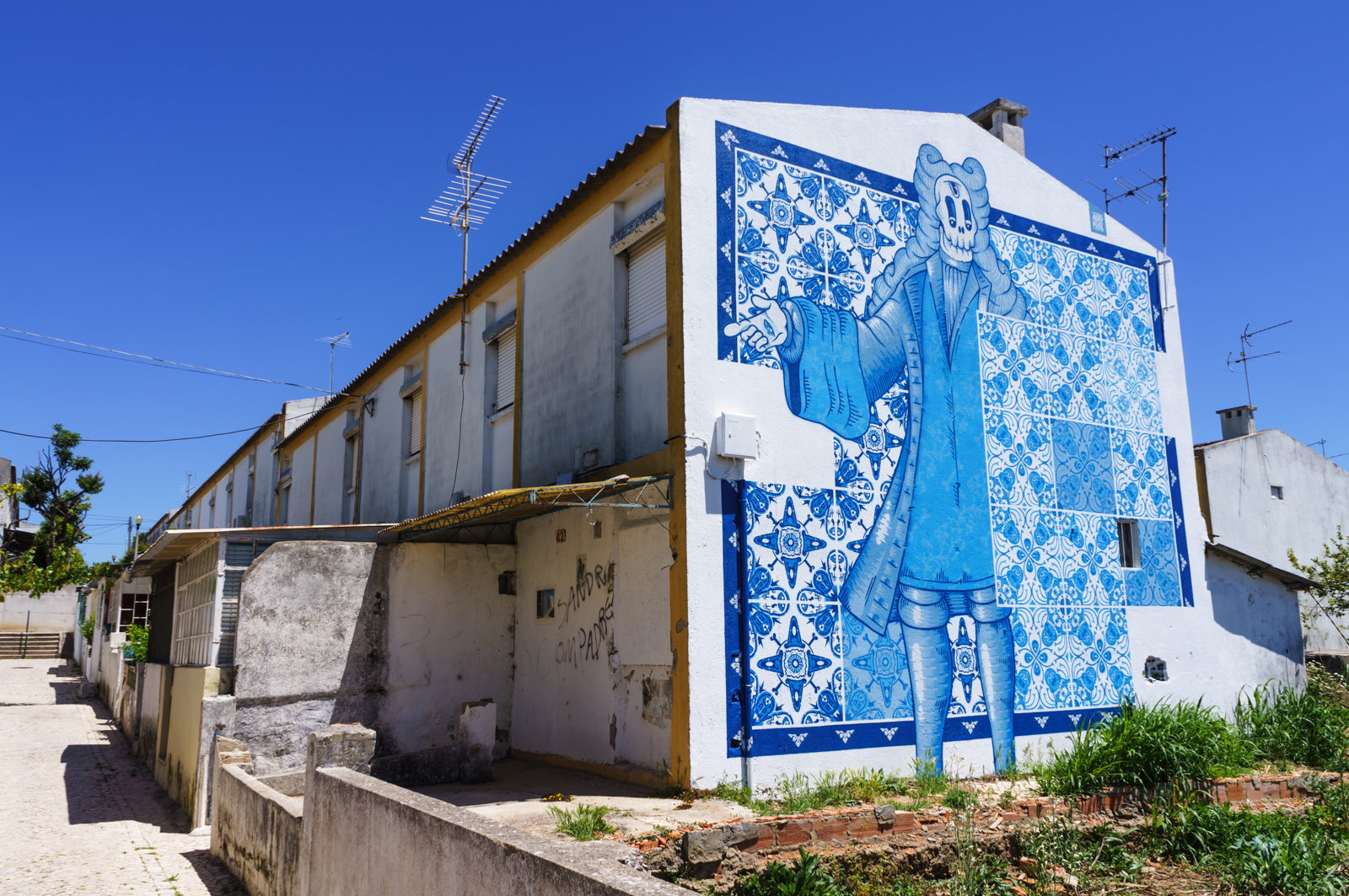
Street art in Carnide depicting a reinterpretation of Marquês de Pombal

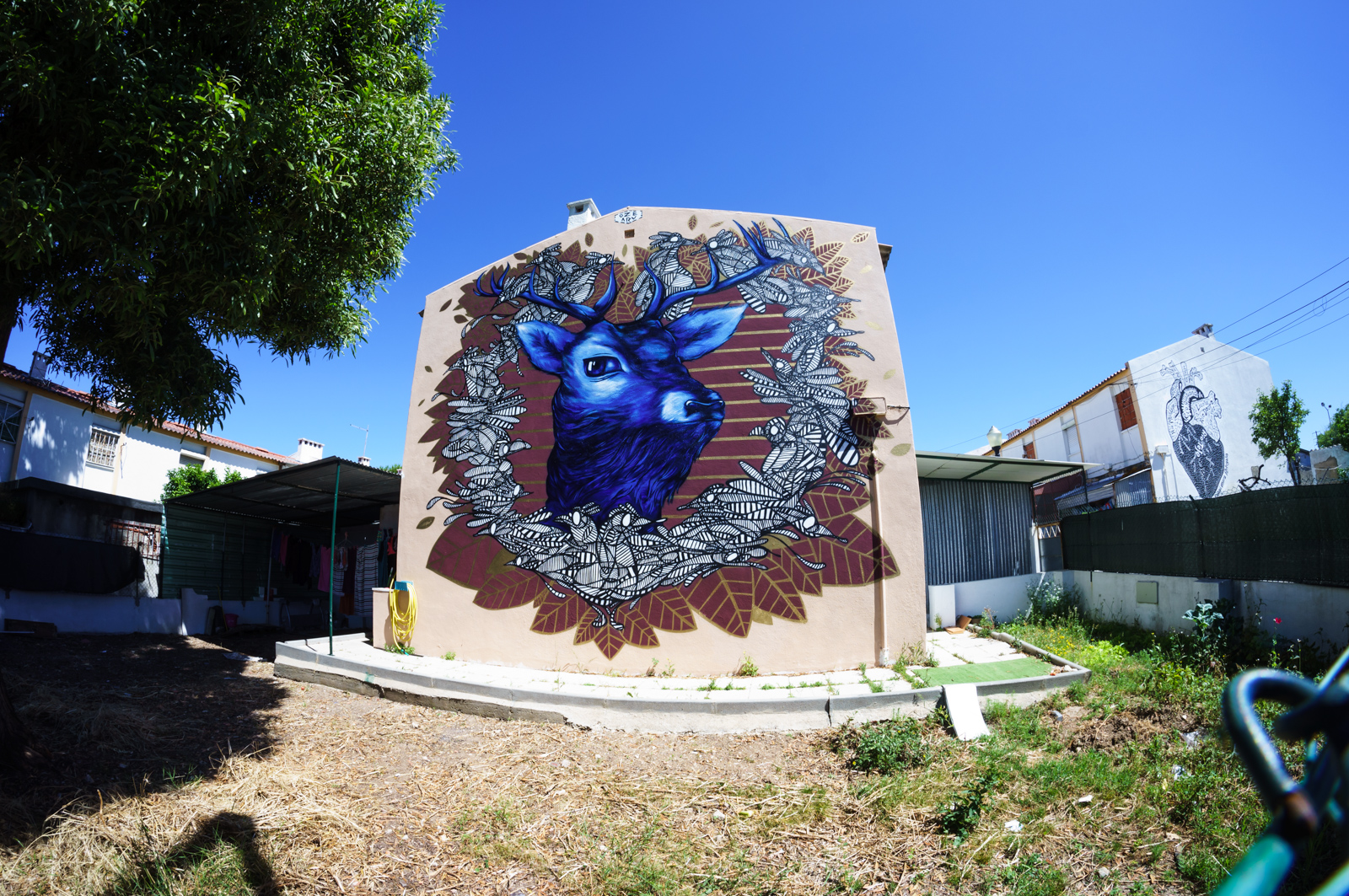
Street art in Carnide

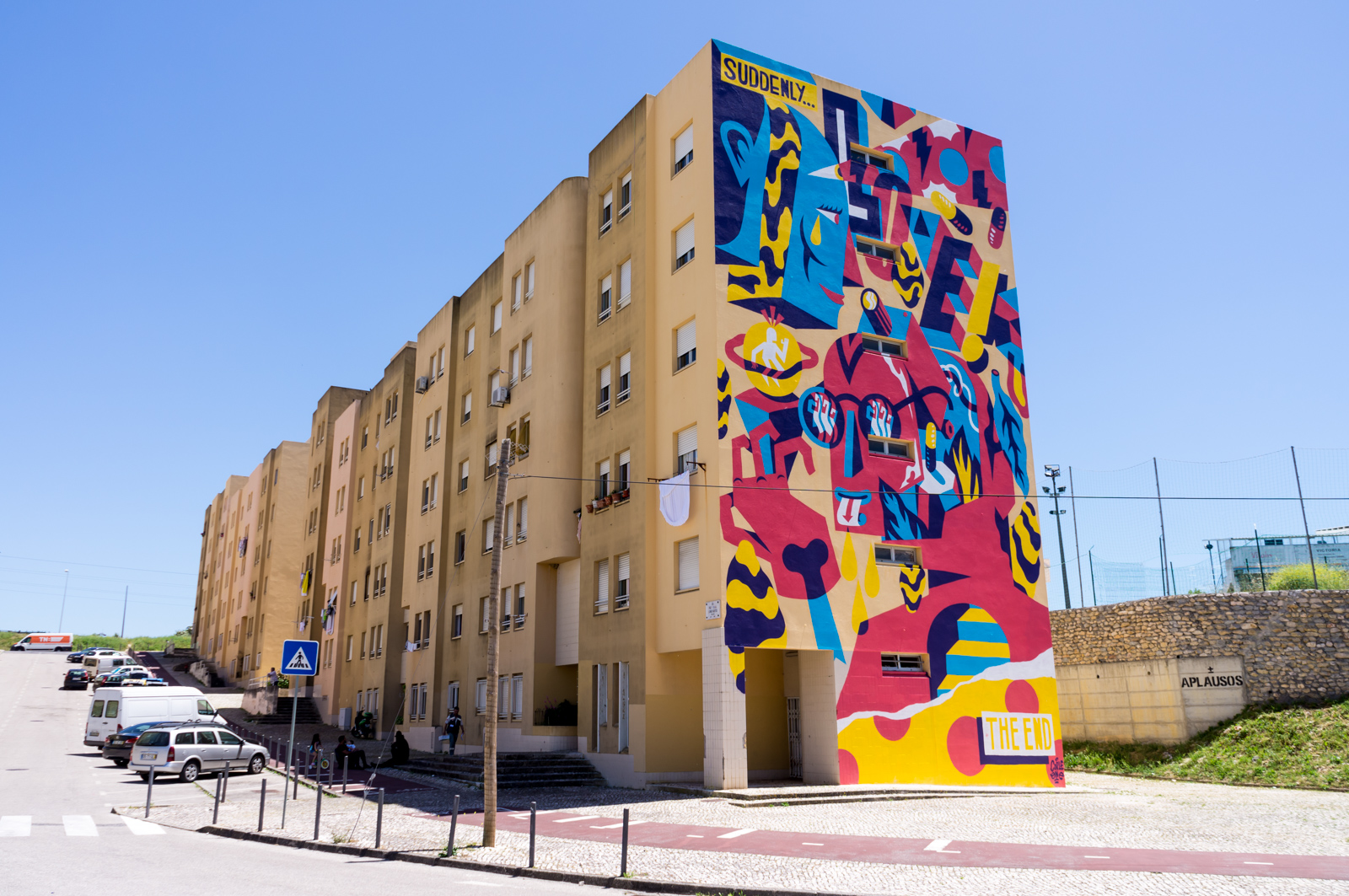
Street art in Carnide

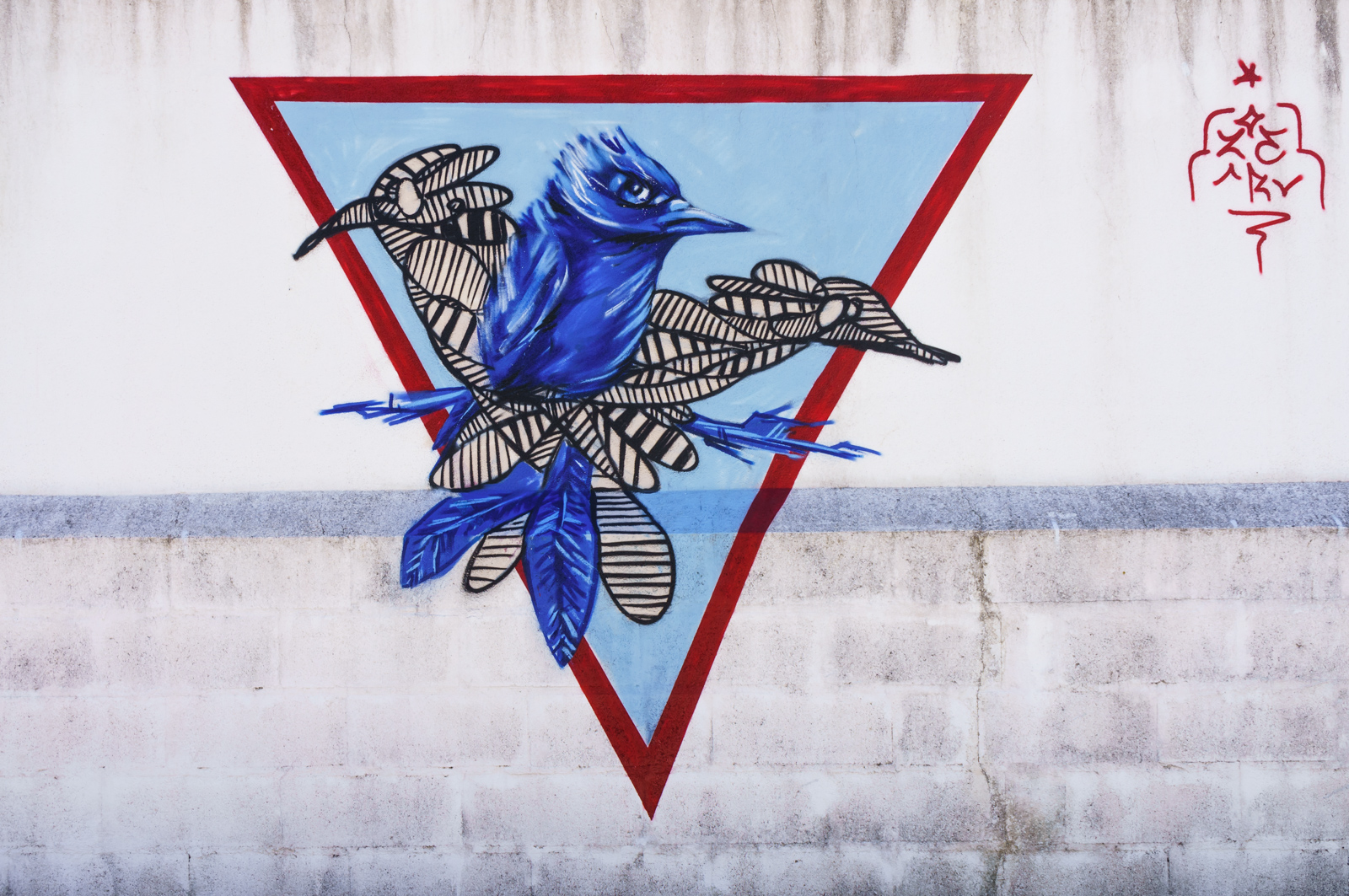
Street art in Carnide

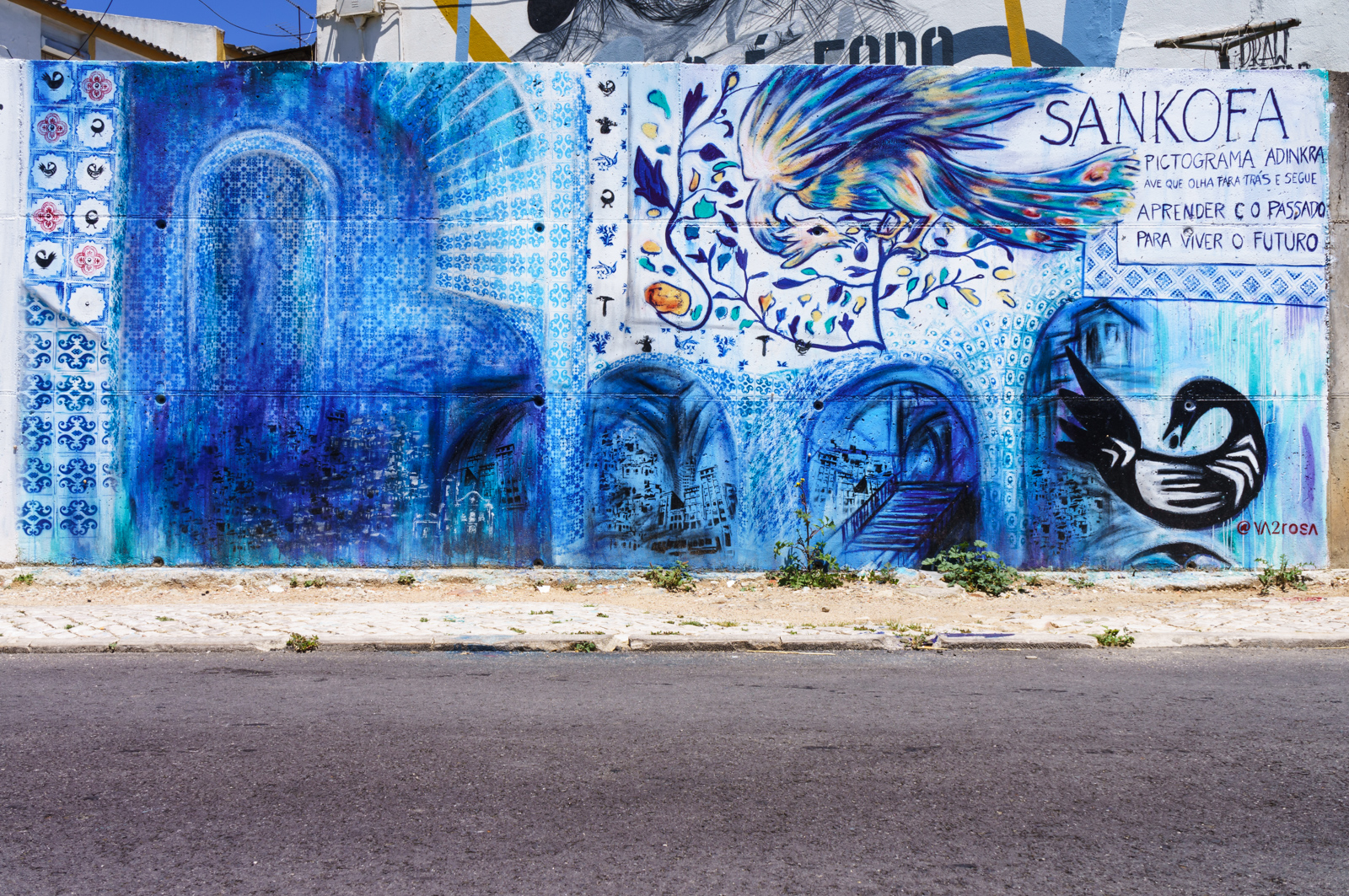
Street art in Carnide

The parish of Carnide was one of those maintained during the administrative reorganization of the city of Lisbon, suffering only minor adjustments along the borders with the neighboring parishes.

The parish has 154 streets. They are:

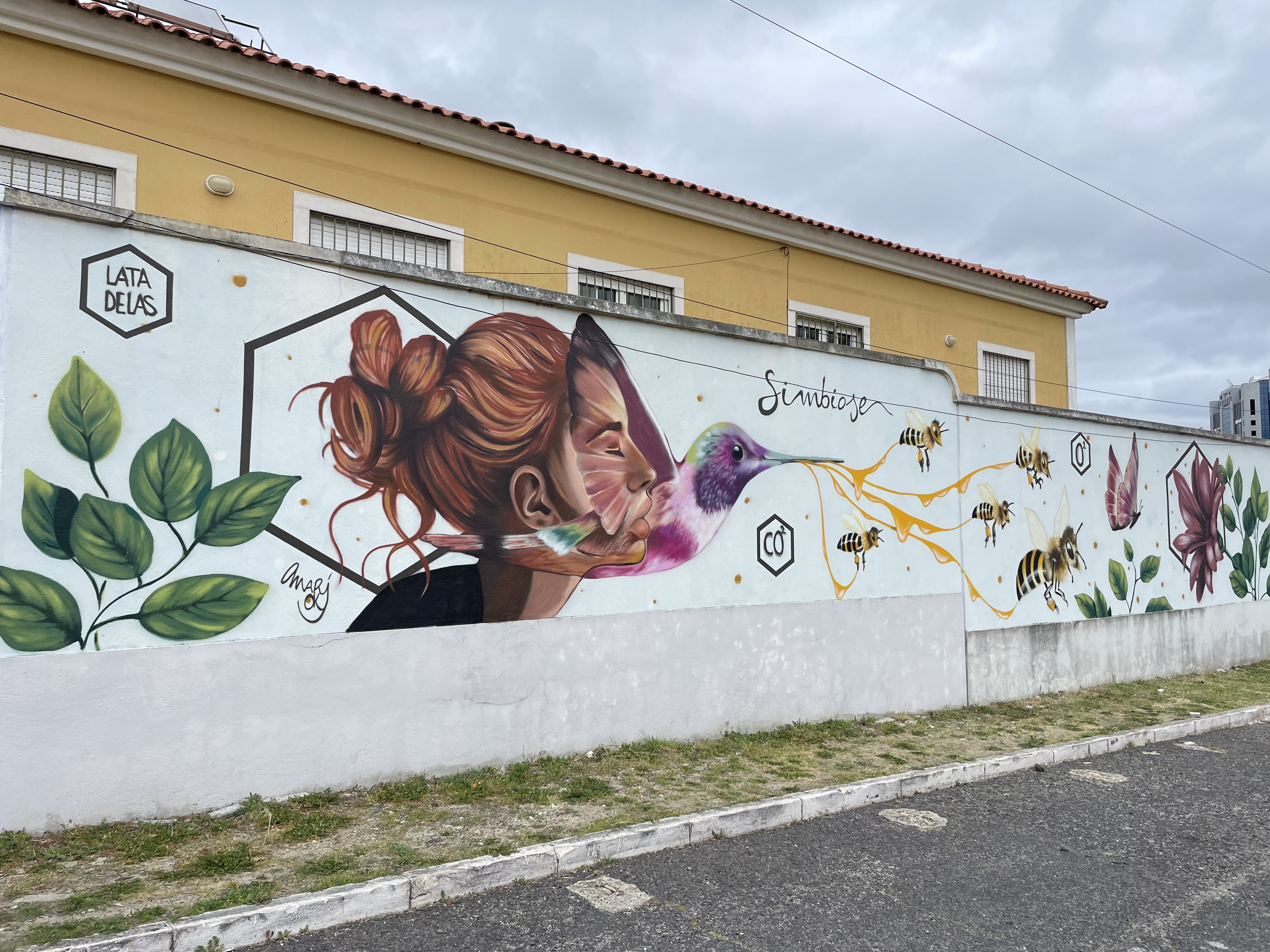
Street art in Carnide

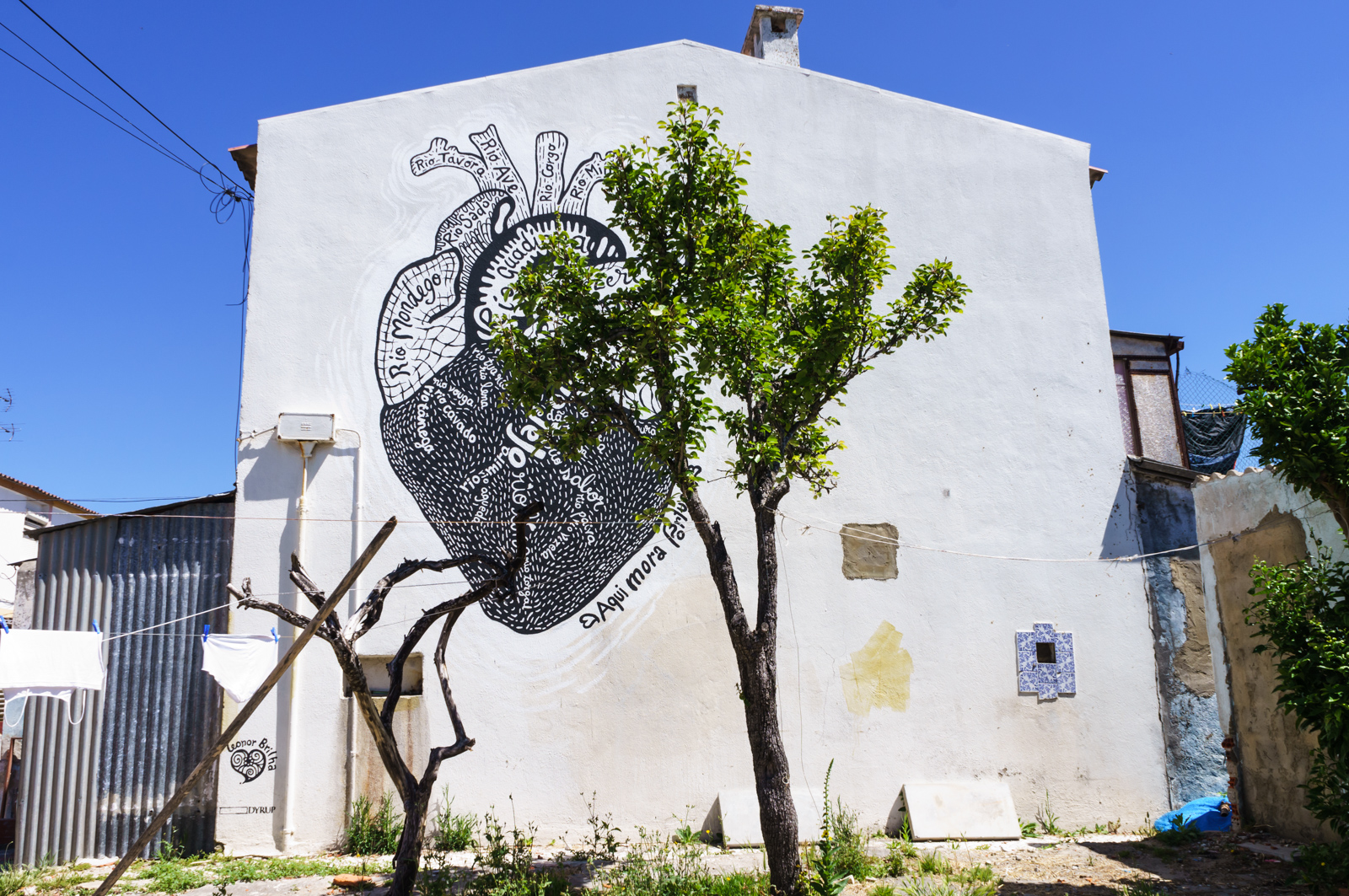
Street art in Carnide

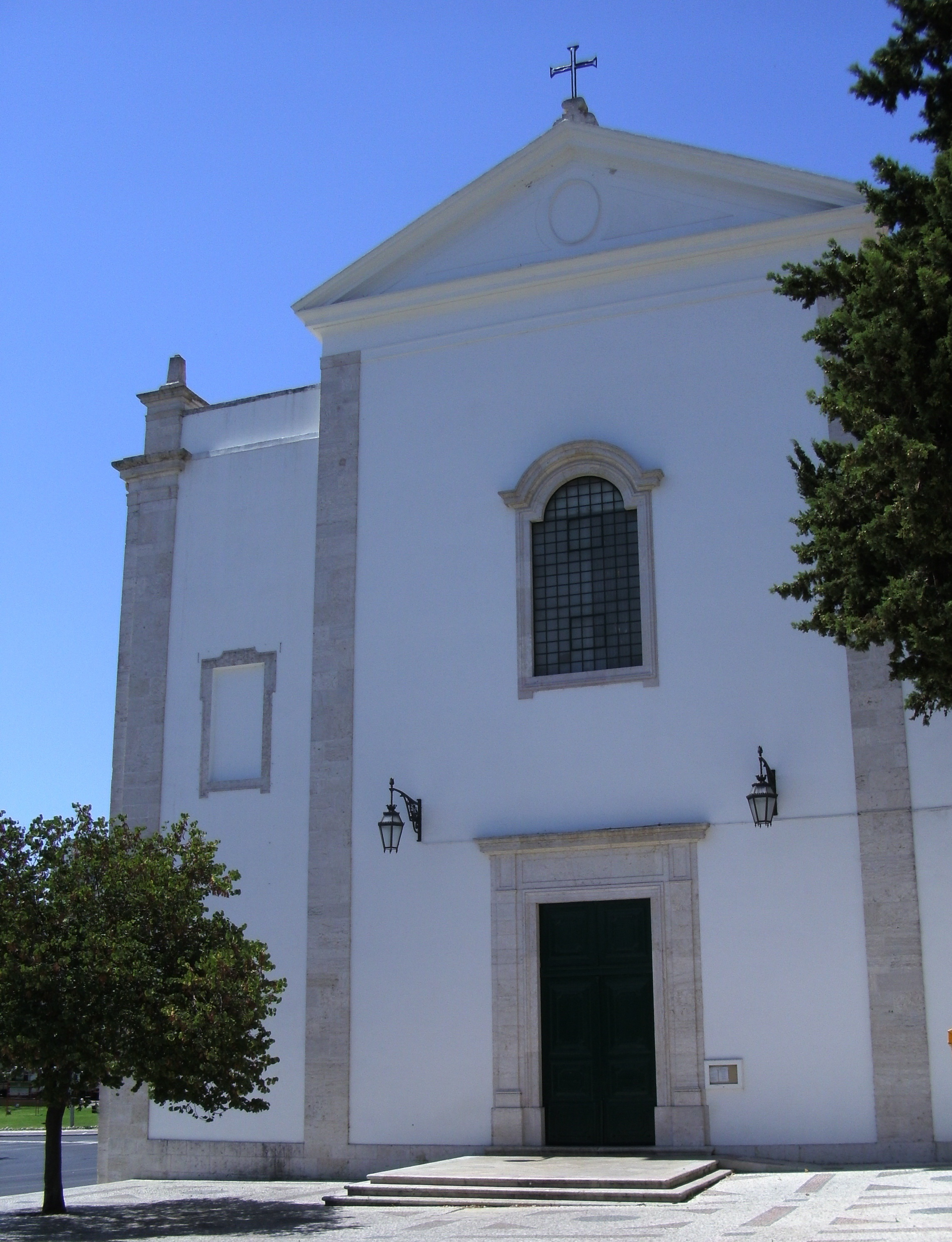
Nossa Senhora da Luz church's façade

- Alameda Roentgen
- Avenida da Cidade de Praga
- Avenida das Nações Unidas
- Avenida do Colégio Militar
- Avenida dos Condes de Carnide
- Avenida Eusébio da Silva Ferreira
- Avenida General Norton de Matos
- Avenida Lusíada
- Avenida Marechal Teixeira Rebelo
- Avenue Prof. Francisco da Gama Caeiro
- Azinhaga da Cova da Onça
- Azinhaga da Fonte
- Azinhaga da Luz
- Azinhaga da Torre do Fato
- Azinhaga das Carmelitas
- Azinhaga das Cerejeiras
- Azinhaga das Freiras
- Azinhaga do Serrado
- Azinhaga dos Cerejais
- Azinhaga dos Lameiros
- Master's Alley
- north alley
- Circumvallation Road
- Estrada da cintura
- Estrada da Luz
- Estrada da Pontinha
- Estrada do Paço do Lumiar
- Estrada do Poço do Chão
- Jardim Adão Barata
- Jardim Bento Martins
- Largo da Luz
- Largo da Revista Militar
- Largo das Pimenteiras
- Largo do Jogo da Bola
- Largo do Malvar
- Largo Francisco Smith
- Largo José João Farinha Jr.
- Largo José Veiga Simao
- Largo Miguel Jose Mendes
- Largo Padre Filipe Carreira Rosário
- Praça Cosme Damião
- Praça Rocha Martins
- Praça San Francisco de Assis
- Rua Adelaide Cabete
- Rua Adelaide Felix
- Rua Albert Einstein
- Rua Alfredo Ferraz
- Rua Alvaro Benamor
- Rua Ana de Castro Osorio
- Rua António Champalimaud
- Rua Aristides de Sousa Mendes
- Rua Augusto Macedo
- Rua Aurelio Quintanilha
- Rua Carlos Alves
- Calle Carlos Morato Rome
- Rua Cesina Adães Bermudes
- Rua Conselheiro José Silvestre Ribeiro
- Rua Corino de Andrade
- Cupertino de Miranda Street
- Rua D. Antonio Francisco Marques
- Fountain Street
- Rua Horta Nova
- Master's Street
- Rua da Quinta das Camareiras
- Rua das Parreiras
- Rua Barcelona
- Rua do Machado
- Rua Norte
- Rua do Rio Águeda
- Rua do Rio Alcoa
- Rua do Rio Almansor
- Rua do Rio Alva
- Rua do Rio Alviela
- Rua do Rio Arade
- Rua do Rio Ave
- Rua do Rio Caia
- Rua do Rio Cávado
- Rua do Rio Ceira
- Rua do Rio Corgo
- Rua do Rio Coura
- Rua do Rio Dão
- Rua do Rio Douro
- Rua do Rio Guadiana
- Rua do Rio Laboreiro
- Rua do Rio Lena
- Rua do Rio Liz
- Rua do Rio Minho
- Rua do Rio Mira
- Rua do Rio Mondego
- Rua do Rio Paiva
- Rua do Rio Sabor
- Rua do Rio Sado
- Rua do Rio Tâmega
- Rua do Rio Távora
- Rua do Rio Tejo
- Rua do Rio Torgal
- Rua do Rio Tua
- Rua do Rio Vizela
- Rua do Rio Vouga
- Rua do Rio Zêzere
- Rua do Seminario
- Rua Domingos Rebelo
- Rua Palhinhas Taxi
- Rua Eduardo Viana
- Rua Engº Ferry Borges
- Rua Eugénio Salvador
- Rua Fernando Namora
- Rua Fernando Piteira Santos
- Rua Francisco Cortes Pinto
- Rua Galileo Galilei
- Rua General Henrique de Carvalho
- Rua Guiomar Torresão
- Rua Herculano Pimentel
- Rua Joao Morais Barbosa
- Rua Jorge Vieira
- Rua José Farinha
- Rua Jose Gamboa
- Rua José Maria Nicolau
- Rua Laura Ayres
- Rua Manuel Rodrigues da Silva
- Rua Manuela Porto
- Rua Maria Browne
- Rua Maria de Lourdes de Mello e Castro
- Rua Maria José Estanco
- Rua Maria Veleda
- Rua Mariana Vilar
- Rua Neves Costa
- Rua Padre Americo
- Rua Particular à Azinhaga dos Lameiros
- Rua Pires Jorge
- Rua Poeta Bocage
- Rua Prista Monteiro
- Rua Prof. Almeida Lima
- Rua Prof. Arsenio Nunes
- Rua Prof. Francisco Pereira de Moura
- Rua Prof. Jorge Campinos
- Rua Prof. Lindley Cintra
- Rua Prof. Luís da Cunha Gonçalves
- Rua Prof.ª Maria Leonor Buescu
- Rua Prof. Miller Guerra
- Rua Prof. Pais da Silva
- Rua Prof. Sedas Nunes
- Rua Prof. Tiago de Oliveira
- Rua Professor Fidelino de Figueiredo
- Rua Públia Hortênsia de Castro
- Rua Sidónio Serpa
- Rua Virgilio Martino
- Rua Victor Santos
- Travessa da Luz
- Travessa do Cascão
- Travessa do jogo da bola
- Travessa do Machado
- Travessa do Malvar
- Travessa do Preoeiro
