= Portuguese literature =

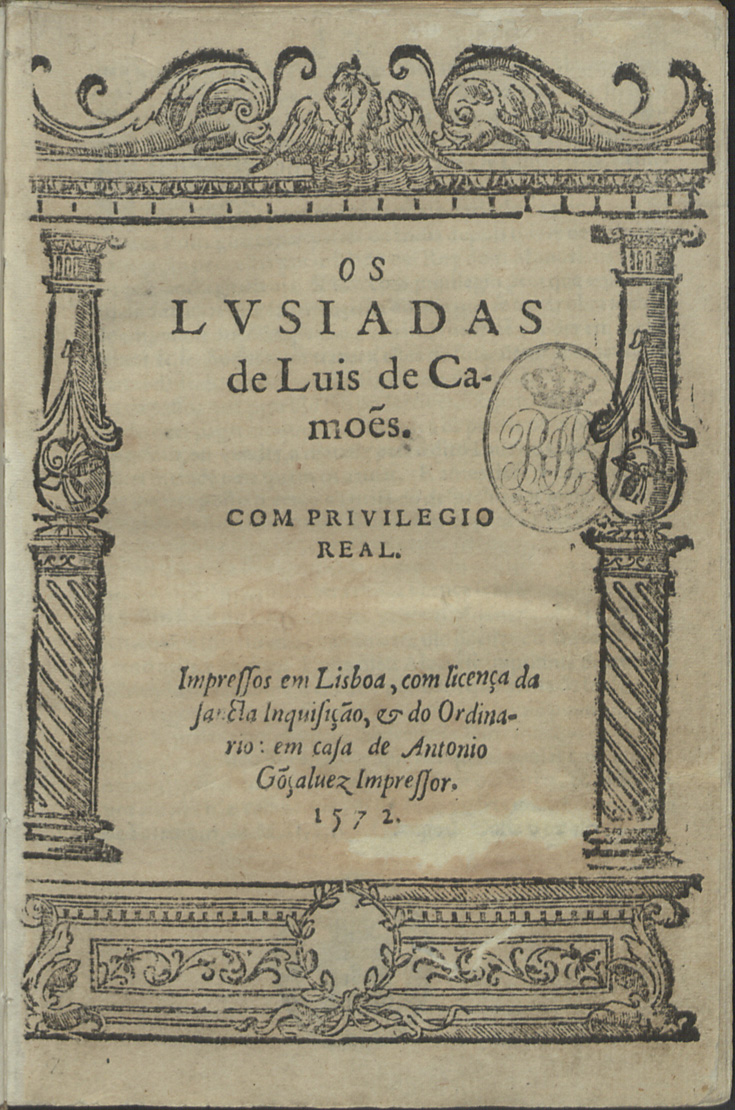
"Os Lusíadas" by Luís Vaz de Camões

Portuguese literature, in its broader sense, is literature written in the Portuguese language, from the Portuguese-speaking world. It can refer to Lusophone literature written by authors from Portugal, Brazil, Angola, Mozambique, and other Community of Portuguese Language Countries. This article focuses on Portuguese literature sensu stricto, that is, literature from the country of Portugal.

An early example of Portuguese literature is the tradition of a medieval Galician-Portuguese poetry, originally developed in Galicia and northern Portugal. The literature of Portugal is distinguished by a wealth and variety of lyric poetry, which has characterized it from the beginning of its language, after the Roman occupation; by its wealth of historical writing documenting Portugal's rulers, conquests, and expansion; by then considered the Golden Age of the Renaissance period of which it forms part of the moral and allegorical Renaissance drama of Gil Vicente, Bernardim Ribeiro, Sá de Miranda and especially the great 16th-century national epic of Luís de Camões, author of the national and epic poem Os Lusíadas (The Lusiads).

The seventeenth century was marked by the introduction of the Baroque in Portugal and is generally regarded as the century of literary decadence, despite the existence of writers like Father António Vieira, Padre Manuel Bernardes and Francisco Rodrigues Lobo.

The writers of the eighteenth century tried to counteract a certain decadence of the baroque stage by making an effort to recover the level of quality attained during the Golden Age, through the creation of academies and literary Arcadias - it was the time of Neoclassicism. In the nineteenth century, the neoclassical ideals were abandoned, where Almeida Garrett introduced Romanticism, followed by Alexandre Herculano and Camilo Castelo Branco.

In the second half of the nineteenth century, Realism (of naturalistic features) developed in novel-writing, whose exponents included Eça de Queiroz and Ramalho Ortigão. Literary trends during the twentieth century are represented mainly by Fernando Pessoa, considered one of the greatest national poets together with Camões, and, in later years, by the development of prose fiction, thanks to authors such as António Lobo Antunes and José Saramago, winner of the Nobel prize for Literature.

== Birth of a literary language ==
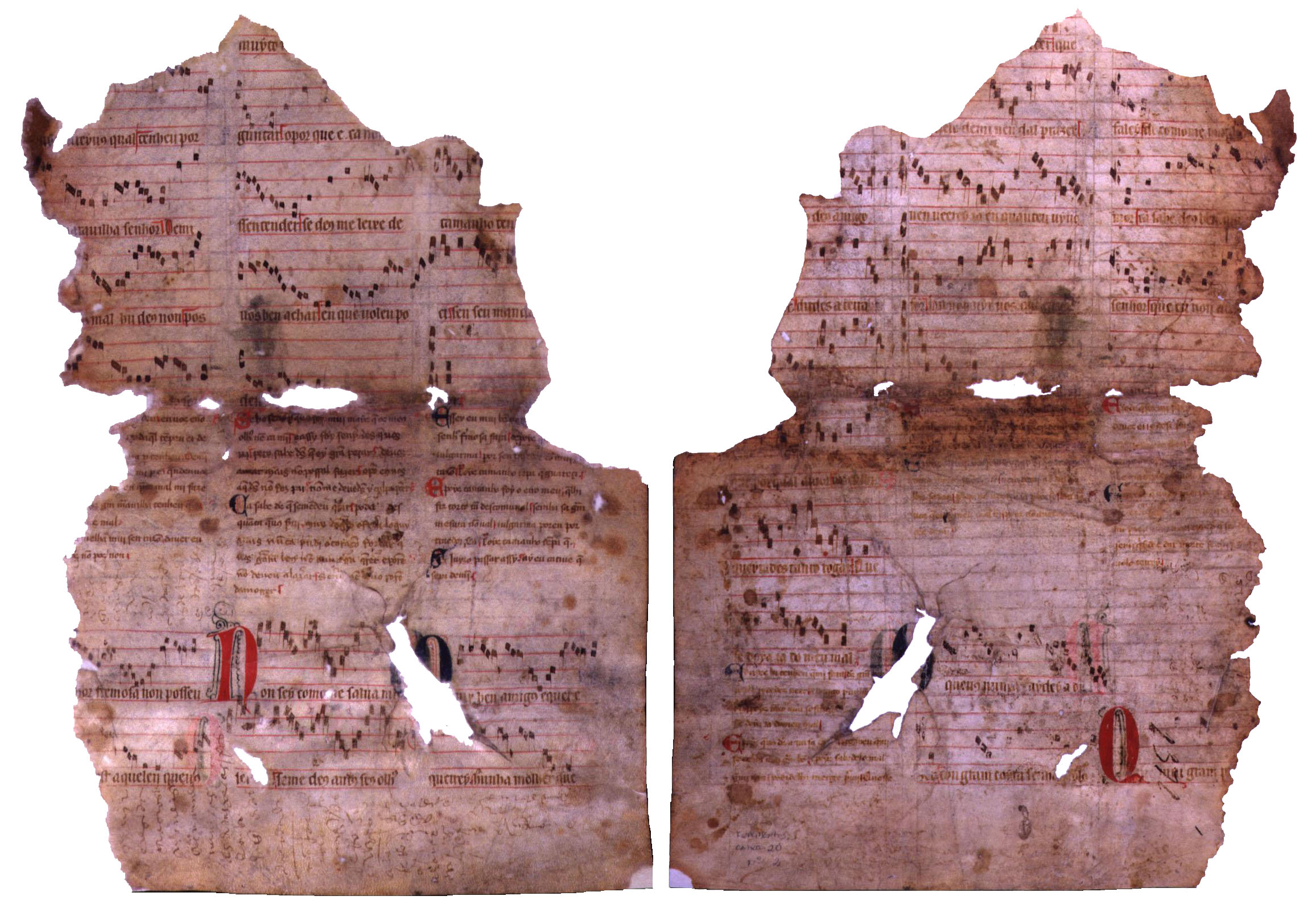
The Pergaminho Sharrer ("Sharrer Parchment"), containing songs by King Dinis I.

=== Verse ===
It has been argued (by great early scholars such as Henry Roseman Lang and Carolina Michaëlis de Vasconcellos) that an indigenous popular poetry existed before the beginning of the written record, although the first datable poems (a handful between around 1200 and 1225) show influences from Provence. These poems were composed in Galician-Portuguese, also known as Old Portuguese. The first known venues of poetic activity were aristocratic courts in Galicia and the North of Portugal (we know this thanks to the recent work of the Portuguese historian António Resende de Oliveira). After that the center shifted to the court of Alfonso X (The Wise King), King of Castile and León (etc.). Some of the same poets (and others) practiced their craft in the court of Afonso III of Portugal, who had been educated in France. The main manuscript sources for Galician-Portuguese verse are the Cancioneiro da Ajuda probably a late 13th-century manuscript, the Cancioneiro da Vaticana and the Cancioneiro da Biblioteca Nacional (also called Cancioneiro Colocci-Brancuti). Both these latter codices were copied in Rome at the behest of the Italian humanist Angelo Colocci, probably around 1525.

There was a late flowering during the reign of King Dinis I (1261–1325), a very learned man, whose output is the largest preserved (137 texts). The main genres practiced were the male-voiced cantiga d'amor, the female-voiced cantiga d'amigo (though all the poets were male) and the poetry of insult, called cantigas d'escarnio e maldizer (songs of scorn and insult). This 13th-century Court poetry, which deals mainly with love and personal insult (often wrongly called satire), by no means derives entirely from Provençal models and conventions (as is often said). Most scholars and critics favor the cantigas d'amigo, which probably were "rooted in local folksong" (Henry Roseman Lang, 1894), and in any event are the largest surviving body of female-voiced love lyric that has survived from ancient or medieval Europe. The total corpus of medieval Galician-Portuguese lyric, excluding the Cantigas de Santa Maria, consists of around 1,685 texts. In addition to the large manuscripts named above, we also have a few songs with music in the Vindel Parchment, which contains melodies for six cantigas d'amigo of Martin Codax, and the Pergaminho Sharrer, a fragment of a folio with seven cantigas d'amor of King Dinis. In both these manuscripts the poems are the same we find in the larger codices and moreover in the same order.

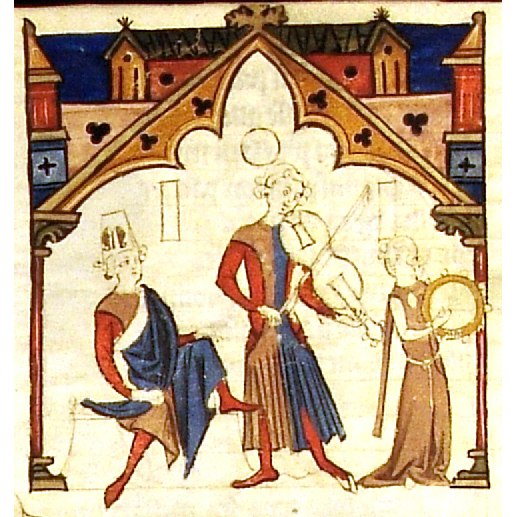
Musicians in a miniature of the Cancioneiro da Ajuda.

By the middle of the 15th century, troubadour verse was effectively dead, replaced by a limper form of court poetry, represented in the Cancioneiro Geral compiled in the 16th century by poet and humanist Garcia de Resende. Meanwhile, the people were elaborating a ballad poetry of their own, the body of which is known as the Romanceiro. It consists of lyrico-narrative poems treating of war, chivalry, adventure, religious legends, and the sea, many of which have great beauty and contain traces of the varied civilizations which have existed in the peninsula. When the Court poets had exhausted the artifices of Provençal lyricism, they imitated the poetry of the people, giving it a certain vogue which lasted until the Classical Renaissance. It was then thrust into the background, and though cultivated by a few, it remained unknown to men of letters until the nineteenth century, when Almeida Garrett began his literary revival and collected folk poems from the mouths of the peasantry.

=== Prose ===
Prose developed later than verse and first appeared in the 13th century in the shape of short chronicles, lives of saints, and genealogical treatises called Livros de Linhagens. In Portuguese chanson de geste has survived to this day, but there are medieval poems of romantic adventure given prose form; for example, the Demanda do Santo Graal (Quest for the Holy Grail) and "Amadis of Gaul". The first three books of the latter probably received their present shape from João Lobeira, a troubadour of the end of the 13th century, though this original has been lost and only a 16th-century Spanish version remains. The Book of Aesop also belongs to this period. Though the cultivated taste of the Renaissance affected to despise the medieval stories, it adopted them with alterations as a homage to classical antiquity. Hence came the cycle of the "Palmerins" and the Chronica do Emperador Clarimundo of João de Barros. The medieval romance of chivalry gave place to the pastoral novel, the first example of which is the Saudades of Bernardim Ribeiro, followed by the Diana of Jorge de Montemayor, a Portuguese writer who wrote in Spanish. Later in the sixteenth century Gonçalo Fernandes Trancoso, a fascinating storyteller, produced his Historias de Proveito e Exemplo.

== 15th century ==
=== Prose ===
A new epoch in literature dates from the Revolution of 1383-1385. King John I wrote a book of the chase, his sons, King Duarte and Peter, Duke of Coimbra, composed moral treatises, and an anonymous scribe told with charming naïveté the story of the heroic Nuno Álvares Pereira in the Chronica do Condestavel. The line of the chroniclers which is one of the boasts of Portuguese literature began with Fernão Lopes, who compiled the chronicles of the reigns of Kings Pedro I, Fernando I, and John I. He combined a passion for accurate statement with a special talent for descriptive writing and portraiture, and with him a new epoch dawns. Azurara, who succeeded him in the post of official chronicler, and wrote the Chronicle of Guinea and chronicles of the African wars, is an equally reliable historian, whose style is marred by pedantry and moralizing. His successor, Ruy de Pina, avoids these defects and, though not an artist like Lopes, gives a useful record of the reigns of Kings Duarte, Afonso V, and John II. His history of the latter monarch was appropriated by the poet Garcia de Resende, who embellished it with anecdotes gathered during his intimacy with John, and issued it under his own name.

=== Poetry ===
The introduction of Italian poetry, especially that of Petrarch, into the peninsula led to a revival of Castilian verse, which was dominant in Portugal throughout the fifteenth century. Constable Dom Pedro, friend of the Marquis of Santillana, wrote almost entirely in Castilian and is the first representative of the Castilian influence, which imported from Italy the love of allegory and reverence for classical antiquity. The court poetry of some three hundred knights and gentlemen of the time of Afonso V and John II is contained in the "Cancioneiro Geral", compiled by Resende and inspired by Juan de Mena, Jorge Manrique, and other Spaniards. The subjects of these mostly artificial verses are love and satire. Among the few that reveal special talent and genuine poetical feeling are Resende's lines on the death of Inês de Castro, the "Fingimento de Amores" of Diogo Brandão, and the "Coplas" of D. Pedro. Bernardim Ribeiro, Gil Vicente, and Sá de Miranda, who find menton in the "Cancioneiro," went on to create a literary revolution.

== Early sixteenth century ==
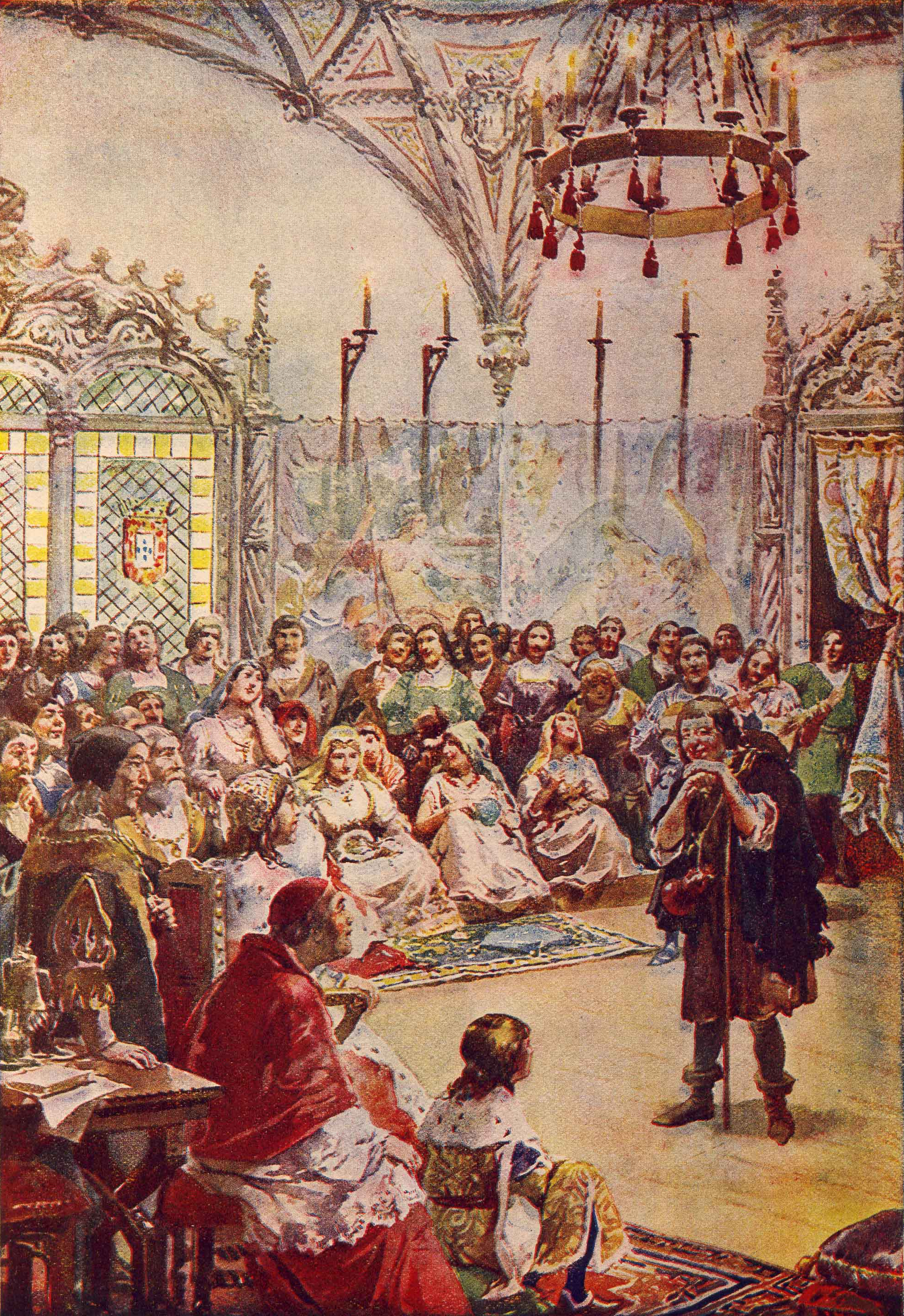
Gil Vicente's O Monólogo do vaqueiro (Monologue of the Cowherd), by Alfredo Roque Gameiro.

=== Pastoral poetry ===
Portuguese pastoral poetry is more natural and sincere than that of the other nations because Ribeiro, the founder of the bucolic school, sought inspiration in the national serranilhas; however, his eclogues, despite beng rich in feeling and rhythmic harmony, are surpassed by the "Crisfal" of Cristóvão Falcão. These, as well as the eclogues and sententious "Cartas" of Sá de Miranda, are written in versos de arte mayor. The popular medida velha (as the national metre was afterwards called, to distinguish it from the Italian hendecasyllable), continued to be used by Camões in his so-called minor works, as also by Bandarra in his prophecies and Gil Vicente.

=== Drama ===
Though Gil Vicente did not originate dramatic representations, he is considered the father of the Portuguese stage. Of his forty-four pieces, fourteen are in Portuguese and eleven in Castilian; the remaining pieces are bilingual and consist of autos, that is, devotional works, tragicomedies, and farces. Beginning in 1502 with religious pieces, conspicuous among them being "Auto da Alma" and the famous trilogy of the "Barcas", he soon introduces the comic and satirical element to provide relief and achieve moral aims. By the close of his career in 1536, he had arrived at pure comedy, as found in "Inês Pereira" and the "Floresta de Enganos", besides developing the study of character. The plots are simple, the dialogue spirited, the lyrics often of finished beauty, and while Gil Vicente appeared too early to be a great dramatist, his plays mirror to perfection the types, customs, language, and daily life of all classes. The playwrights who followed him had neither superior talents nor court patronage and, facing attacks from the classical school for their lack of culture and from the Inquisition for their grossness, they were reduced to entertaining the lower classes at country fairs and festivals.

== First classical phase: The Renaissance ==
The Renaissance produced a pleiad of distinguished poets, historians, critics, antiquaries, theologians, and moralists which made the sixteenth century a golden age.

=== Lyric and epic poetry ===
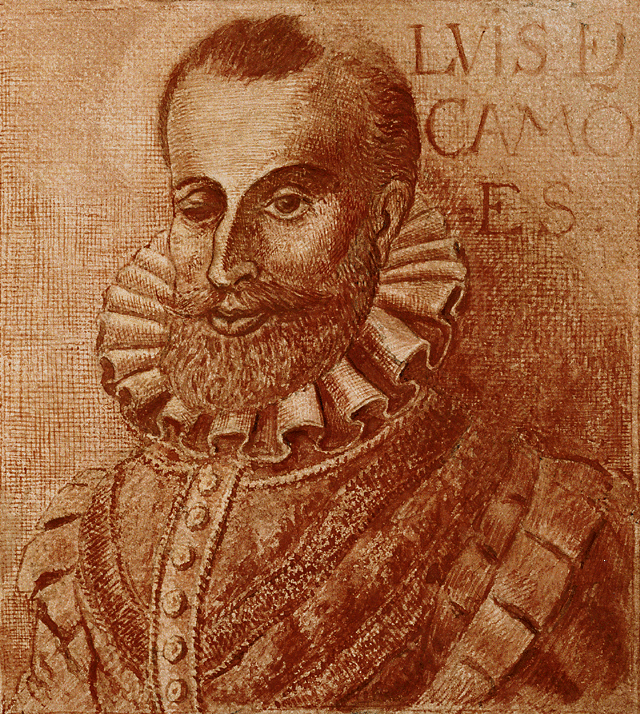
Luís Vaz de Camões.

Sá de Miranda introduced Italian forms of verse and raised the tone of poetry. He was followed by António Ferreira, a superior stylist, by Diogo Bernardes, and Andrade Caminha, but the imitation of classical models by the Quinhentistas came at the cost of spontaneity, with the verse of Frei Agostinho da Cruz being an exception. The genius of Luís de Camões led him to fuse the best elements of the Italian and popular muse, thus creating a new poetry. Imitators arose in the succeeding centuries, but most of their epics are little more than chronicles in verse. The epics include three by Jerónimo Corte-Real, and one each by Pereira Brandão, Francisco de Andrade, Rodrigues Lobo, Pereira de Castro, Sá de Menezes, and Garcia de Mascarenhas.

=== The classical plays ===
Sá de Miranda endeavoured also to reform the drama and, shaping himself on Italian models, wrote the "Estrangeiros". Jorge Ferreira de Vasconcellos had produced in "Eufrosina" the first prose play, but the comedies of Sá and António Ferreira are artificial and stillborn productions, though the latter's tragedy, "Inês de Castro", if dramatically weak, has something of Sophocles in the spirit and form of the verse.

=== Prose ===
The best prose work of the sixteenth century is devoted to history and travel. João de Barros in his "Decadas", continued by Diogo do Couto, described with mastery the deeds achieved by the Portuguese in the discovery and conquest of the lands and seas of the Orient. Damião de Góis, humanist and friend of Erasmus, wrote with rare independence on the reign of King Manuel I of Portugal. Bishop Osório treated of the same subject in Latin, but his interesting "Cartas" are in the vulgar tongue. Among others who dealt with the East are Fernão Lopes de Castanheda, António Galvão, Gaspar Correia, Bras de Albuquerque, Frei Gaspar da Cruz, and Frei João dos Santos. The chronicles of the kingdom were continued by Francisco de Andrade and Frei Bernardo da Cruz, and Miguel Leitão de Andrade compiled an interesting volume of "Miscellanea". The travel literature of the period is too large for detailed mention: Persia, Syria, Abyssinia, Florida, and Brazil were visited and described and Father Lucena compiled a classic life of St. Francis Xavier. The "Peregrination" of Fernão Mendes Pinto, a typical Conquistador, is worth all the story books put together for its extraordinary adventures told in a vigorous style, full of colour and life, while the "História trágico-marítima", a record of notable shipwrecks between 1552 and 1604, has good specimens of simple anonymous narrative. The dialogues of Samuel Usque, a Lisbon Jew, also deserve mention. Religious subjects were usually treated in Latin, but among moralists who used the vernacular were Frei Heitor Pinto, Bishop Arraez, and Frei Thome de Jesus, whose "Trabalhos de Jesus" has appeared in many languages.

== Second classical phase: Baroque ==
The alleged inferiority of seventeenth-century literature to that of the preceding age has been blamed on the new royal absolutism, the Portuguese Inquisition, the Index, and the exaggerated humanism of the Jesuits who directed higher education; nevertheless, had a man of genius appeared he would have overcome all obstacles. In fact, the world of letters shared in the national decline. The influence of Gongora and Marino was felt by all the Seiscentistas, as may be seen in the "Fenix Renascida". The Revolution of 1640 restored a Portuguese king to the throne, but could not undo the effects of the sixty years of personal union with the Spanish crown. The use of Spanish continued among the upper class and was preferred by many authors who desired a larger audience. Spain had given birth to great writers for whom the Portuguese forgot the earlier ones of their own land. The foreign influence was strongest in the drama. The leading Portuguese playwrights wrote in Spanish, and in the national tongue only poor religious pieces and a witty comedy by D. Francisco Manuel de Mello, "Auto do Fidalgo Aprendiz", were produced. The numerous Academies, which arose bearing exotic names, aimed at raising the level of letters, but they engaged in discussions of ridiculous theses that led to the triumph of pedantry and bad taste.

=== Lyric poetry ===
Melodious verses relieve the dullness of the pastoral romances of Rodrigues Lobo, while his "Corte na Aldea" is a book of varied interest in elegant prose. The versatile D. Francisco Manuel de Mello, in addition to his sonnets on moral subjects, wrote pleasing imitations of popular romances, but is at his best in a reasoned but vehement "Memorial to John IV", in the witty "Apologos Dialogaes", and in the homely philosophy of the "Carta de Guia de Casados", prose classics. Other poets of the period are Soror Violante do Ceo, and Frei Jerónimo Vahia, convinced Gongorists, Frei Bernardo de Brito with the "Sylvia de Lizardo", and the satirists, D. Tomás de Noronha and António Serrão de Castro.

=== Prose ===
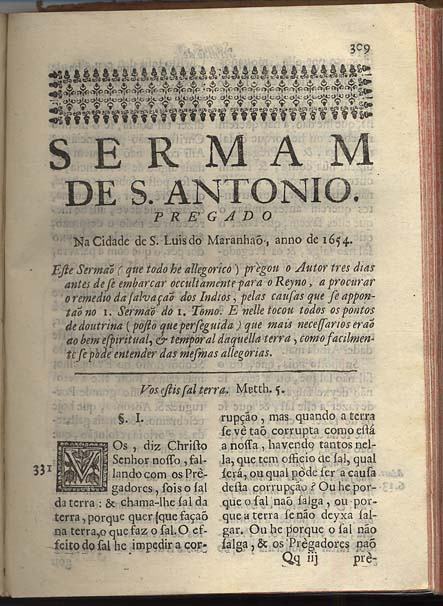
Sermon of Saint Anthony to the Fish (1654) by António Vieira.

The century had a richer output in prose than in verse, and history, biography, sermons, and epistolary correspondence all flourished. Writers on historical subjects were usually friars who worked in their cells and not, as in the sixteenth century, travelled men and eyewitnesses of the events they describe. They occupied themselves largely with questions of form and are better stylists than historians. Among the five contributors to the ponderous "Monarchia Lusitana", only the conscientious Frei António Brandão fully realized the importance of documentary evidence. Frei Bernardo de Brito begins his work with the creation and ends it where he should have begun; he constantly mistakes legend for fact, but was a patient investigator and vigorous narrator. Frei Luis de Sousa, the famous stylist, worked up existing materials into the classical hagiography "Vida de D. Frei Bartolomeu dos Mártires" and "Annaes d'el Rei D. João III. Manuel de Faria e Sousa, historian and arch-commentator of Camões, by a strange irony of fate chose Spanish as his vehicle, as did Mello for his classic account of the Catalan War, while Jacinto Freire de Andrade told in grandiloquent language the story of justice-loving viceroy, D. João de Castro.

Ecclesiastical eloquence was at its best in the seventeenth century and the pulpit filled the place of the press of to-day. The originality and imaginative power of his sermons are said to have won for Father António Vieira in Rome the title of "Prince of Catholic Orators" and though they and his letters exhibit some of the prevailing faults of taste, he is nonetheless great both in ideas and expression; perhaps most famous among his sermons is his 1654 Sermon of Saint Anthony to the Fish. The discourses and devotional treatises of the Oratorian Manuel Bernardes, who was a recluse, have a calm and sweetness that we miss in the writings of a man of action like Vieira and, while equally rich, are purer models of classic Portuguese prose. He is at his best in "Luz e Calor" and the "Nova Floresta". Letter writing is represented by such master hands as D. Francisco Manuel de Mello in familiar epistles, Frei António das Chagas in spiritual, and by five short but eloquent documents of human affection, the "Cartas de Mariana Alcoforado".

== Third classical phase: Neo-classicism ==
Affectation continued to mark the literature of the first half of the eighteenth century, but signs of a change gradually appeared and ended in that complete literary reformation known as the Romantic Movement. Distinguished men who fled abroad to escape the prevailing despotism did much for intellectual progress by encouragement and example. Verney criticized the obsolete educational methods and exposed the literary and scientific decadence in the "Verdadeiro Methodo de Estudar", while the various Academies and Arcadias, wiser than their predecessors, worked for purity of style and diction, and translated the best foreign classics.

=== The Academies ===
The Academy of History, established by John V in 1720 in imitation of the French Academy, published fifteen volumes of learned "Memoirs" and laid the foundations for a critical study of the annals of Portugal, counted among its members being Caetano de Sousa, author of the voluminous "Historia da Casa Real", and the bibliographer Barbosa Machado. The Royal Academy of Sciences, founded in 1779, continued the work and placed literary criticism on a sounder footing, but the principal exponents of belles-lettres belonged to the Arcadias.

=== The Arcadians ===
Of these the most important was the Arcadia Ulisiponense, established in 1756 by the poet Cruz e Silva—"to form a school of good example in eloquence and poetry"—and it included the most celebrated writers of the time. Pedro Correia Garção composed the "Cantata de Dido", a classic gem, and many excellent sonnets, odes, and epistles. The bucolic verse of Quita has the tenderness and simplicity of that of Bernardin Ribeiro, while in the mock-heroic poem, "Hyssope", Cruz e Silva satirizes ecclesiastical jealousies, local types, and the prevailing gallomania with real humour. Intestine disputes led to the dissolution of the Arcadia in 1774, but it had done good service by raising the standards of taste and introducing new poetical forms. Unfortunately, its adherents were too apt to content themselves with imitating the ancient classics and the Quinhentistas and they adopted a cold, reasoned style of expression, without emotion or colouring. Their whole outlook was painfully academic. Many of the Arcadians followed the example of a latter-day Maecenas, the Conde de Ericeira, and endeavoured to nationalize the pseudo-classicism which obtained in France. In 1790 the "New Arcadia" came into being and had in Bocage a man who, under other conditions, might have been a great poet. His talent led him to react against the general mediocrity and though he achieved no sustained flights, his sonnets vie with those of Camoens. He was a master of short improvised lyrics as of satire, which he used to effect in the "Pena de Talião" against Agostinho de Macedo.

This turbulent priest constituted himself a literary dictator and in "Os Burros" surpassed all other bards in invective, moreover he sought to supplant the Lusiads by a tasteless epic, "Oriente". He, however, introduced the didactic poem, his odes reach a high level, and his letters and political pamphlets display learning and versatility, but his influence on letters was hurtful. The only other Arcadian worthy of mention is Curvo Semedo, but the "Dissidents", a name given to those poets who remained outside the Arcadias, include three men who show independence and a sense of reality, José Anastácio da Cunha, Nicolão Tolentino, and Francisco Manuel de Nascimento, better known as Filinto Elysio. The first versified in a philosophic and tender strain, the second sketched the custom and follies of the time in quintilhas of abundant wit and realism, the third spent a long life of exile in Paris in reviving the cult of the sixteenth-century poets, purified the language of Gallicisms and enriched it by numerous works, original and translated. Though lacking imagination, his contos, or scenes of Portuguese life, strike a new note of reality, and his blank verse translation of the "Martyrs" of Chateaubriand is a high performance. Shortly before his death he became a convert to the Romantic Movement, for whose triumph in the person of Almeida Garrett he had prepared the way.

=== Brazilian poetry ===
During the eighteenth century the colony of Brazil began to contribute to Portuguese letters. Manuel da Costa wrote a number of Petrarchian sonnets, Manuel Inácio da Silva Alvarenga showed himself an ardent lyricist and cultivator of form, Tomás António Gonzaga became famous by the harmonious verses of his love poem "Marília de Dirceu", while the "Poesias sacras" of António Pereira Sousa Caldas have a certain mystical charm though metrically hard. In epic poetry the chief name is that of Basílio da Gama, whose "O Uraguai" deals with the struggle between the Portuguese and the Paraguay Indians. It is written in blank verse and has some notable episodes. The "Caramuru" of Santa Rita Durão begins with the discovery of Bahia and contains, in a succession of pictures, the early history of Brazil. The passages descriptive of native customs are well written and these poems are superior to anything of the kind produced contemporaneously by the mother country.

=== Prose ===
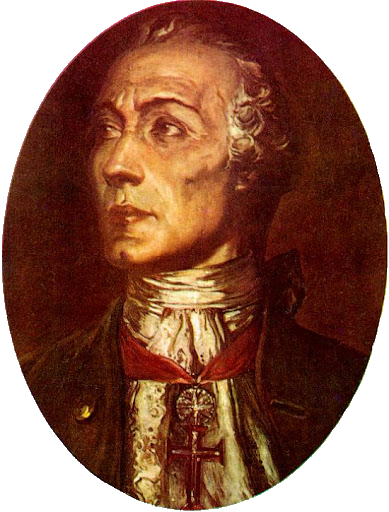
Alexandre de Gusmão (1695–1753).

The prose of the century is mainly dedicated to scientific subjects, but the letters of António da Costa, António Ribeiro Sanches, and Alexandre de Gusmão have literary value and those of the celebrated Carvalheiro d'Oliveira, even if not very accurate, are even more informative.

=== Drama ===
Though a Court returned to Lisbon in 1640, it preferred, for one hundred and fifty years, Italian opera and French plays to vernacular representations. Early in the eighteenth century several authors sprung from the people vainly attempted to found a national drama. Their pieces mostly belong to low comedy. The "Operas Portuguezas" of António José da Silva, produced between 1733 and 1741, have a real comic strength and a certain originality, and, like those of Nicolau Luiz, exploit with wit the faults and foibles of the age. The latter divided his attention between heroic comedies and comedies de capa y espada and, though wanting in ideas and taste, they enjoyed a long popularity. At the same time the Arcadia endeavoured to raise the standard of the stage, drawing inspiration from the contemporary French drama, but its members lacked dramatic talent and achieved little. Garção wrote two bright comedies, Quita some stillborn tragedies, and Manuel de Figueredo compiled plays in prose and verse on national subjects, which fill thirteen volumes, but he could not create characters.

== Romanticism and realism ==
=== Poetry ===
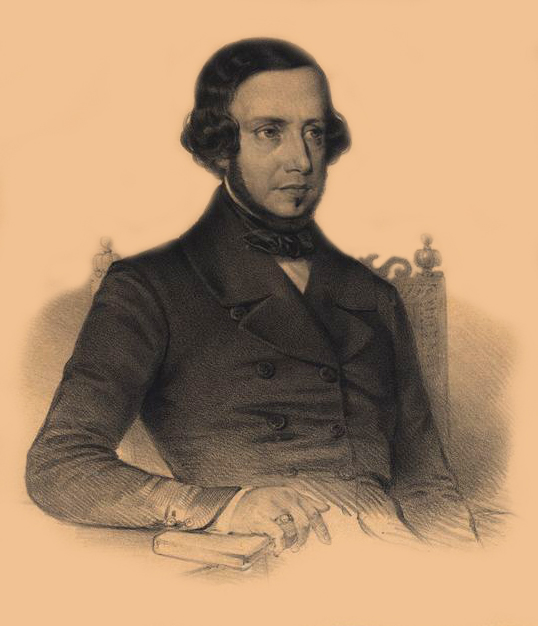
Almeida Garrett (1799–1854).

The early nineteenth century witnessed a literary reformation which was begun by Almeida Garrett who had become acquainted with the English and French Romanticism in exile and based his work on the national traditions. In the narrative poem "Camões" (1825) he broke with the established rules of composition and followed it with "Flores sem Fruto" and a collection of ardent love poems "Folhas Caídas", while the clear elegant prose of this true artist is seen in a miscellany of romance and criticism, "Viagens na minha terra".

The poetry of the austere Alexandre Herculano has a religious or patriotic motive and is reminiscent of Lamennais. The movement initiated by Garrett and Herculano became ultra-Romantic with Castilho, a master of metre, who lacked ideas, and the verses of João de Lemos and the melancholy Soares de Passos record a limited range of personal emotions, while their imitators voice sentiments which they have not felt deeply or at all. Tomás Ribeiro, author of the patriotic poem "D. Jayme", is sincere, but belongs to the same school which thought too much of form and melody.

In 1865 some young poets led by Antero de Quental, and future president Teófilo Braga, rebelled against the domination over letters which Castilho had assumed, and, under foreign influences, proclaimed the alliance of philosophy with poetry. A fierce pamphlet war heralded the downfall of Castilho and poetry gained in breadth and reality, though in many instances it became non-Christian and revolutionary.

Quental produced finely wrought, pessimistic sonnets inspired by neo-Buddhistic and German agnostic ideas, while Braga, a Positivist, compiled an epic of humanity, the "Visão dos Tempos".

Guerra Junqueiro is mainly ironic in the "Morte de D. João", in "Pátria" he evokes and scourges the Braganza kings in some powerful scenes, and in "Os Simples" interprets nature and rural life by the light of a pantheistic imagination. Gomes Leal is merely anti-Christian with touches of Baudelaire. João de Deus belonged to no school; an idealist, he drew inspiration from religion and women, and the earlier verses of the "Campo de Flores" are marked, now by tender feeling, now by sensuous mysticism, all very Portuguese.

Other true poets are the sonneteer João Penha, the Parnassian Goncalves Crespo, and the symbolist Eugénio de Castro. The reaction against the use of verse for the propaganda of radicalism in religion and politics has succeeded and the most considered poets of the early twentieth century, Correia de Oliveira, and Lopes Vieira, were natural singers with no extraneous purpose to serve. They owe much to the "Só" of António Nobre, a book of true race poetry.

=== Drama ===
After producing some classical tragedies, the best of which is "Cato", Almeida Garrett undertook the reform of the stage on independent lines, though he learnt something from the Anglo-German school. Anxious to find a national drama, he chose subjects from Portuguese history and, beginning with "An Auto of Gil Vicente", produced a series of prose plays which culminated in "Brother Luiz de Sousa", a masterpiece. His imitators, Mendes Leal and Pinheiro Chagas, fell victim to ultra-Romanticism, but Fernando Caldeira and Gervásio Lobato wrote lifelike and witty comedies and recently the regional pieces of D. João da Camara have won success, even outside Portugal. At the present time, with the historical and social plays of Lopes de Mendonça, Júlio Dantas, Marcellino Mesquita, and Eduardo Schwalbach, drama is more flourishing than ever before and Garrett's work has fructified fifty years after his death.

=== Novel ===
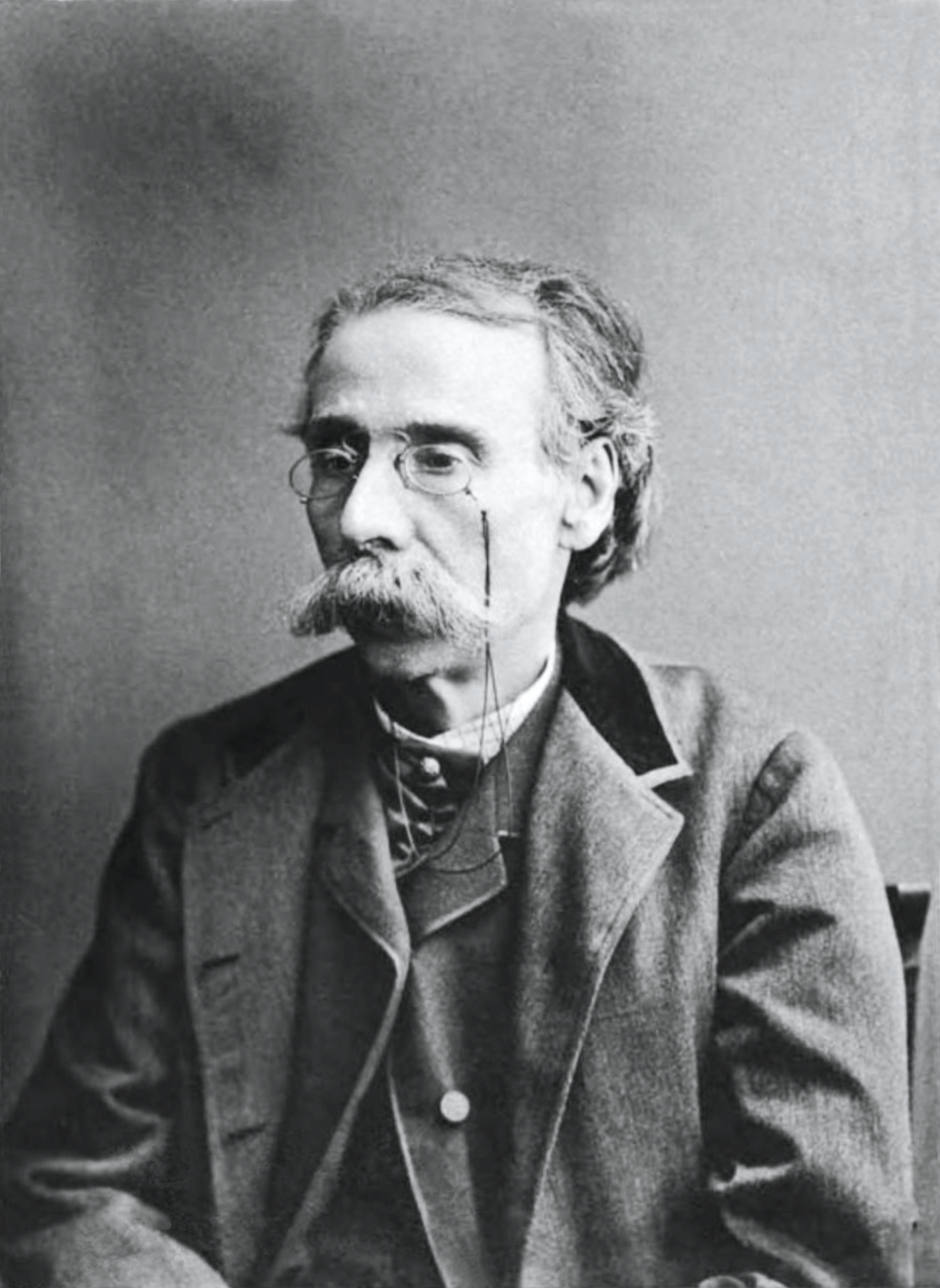
Camilo Castelo Branco (1825–1890).

The novel is really a creation of the nineteenth century and it began with historical romances in the style of Walter Scott by Alexandre Herculano, to whom succeeded Rebelo da Silva with A Mocidade de D. João V, Andrade Corvo, and others. The romance of manners is due to the versatile Camilo Castelo Branco, a rich impressionist who describes to perfection the life of the early part of the century in Amor de Perdição, Novellas do Minho, and other books. Gomes Coelho (Júlio Dinis), a romantic idealist and subjective writer, is known best by As Pupilas do Senhor Reitor, but the great creative artist was José Maria de Eça de Queirós, founder of the Naturalist School, and author of Primo Basílio, Correspondência de Fradique Mendes, A Cidade e as Serras. His characters live and many of his descriptive and satiric passages have become classical. Among the lesser novelists are Pinheiro Chagas, Arnaldo Gama Luís de Magalhães, Teixeira de Queirós, and Malheiro Dias.

=== Other prose ===
History became a science with Alexandre Herculano whose História de Portugal is also valuable for its sculptural style, and Joaquim Pedro de Oliveira Martins ranks as a painter of scenes and characters in Os Filhos de D. João I and Vida de Nuno Álvares. A strong gift of humour distinguishes the As Farpas of Ramalho Ortigão, as well as the work of Fialho d'Almeida and Julio Cesar Machado, and literary criticism had able exponents in Luciano Cordeiro and Moniz Barreto. The Panorama under the editorship of Herculano exercised a sound and wide influence over letters, but since that time the press has become less and less literary and now treats of little save politics.

== Examples of Portuguese literature ==
=== Luís Vaz de Camões ===
The poet Luís Vaz de Camões (1524 - June 10, 1580) was the author of the epic poem Os Lusíadas. (In the Victorian era, he was both sufficiently admired and sufficiently obscure for Elizabeth Barrett Browning to disguise her work by entitling it Sonnets from the Portuguese, a reference to Camões).

The Portuguese national holiday, "Portugal Day" or "Dia de Portugal, das Comunidades Portuguesas e de Camões" (Day of Portugal, Camões, and the Portuguese Communities), is celebrated on 10 June, the anniversary of Camões' death. It is a day of national pride similar to the "Independence Day" celebrated in other countries.

=== Eça de Queirós ===
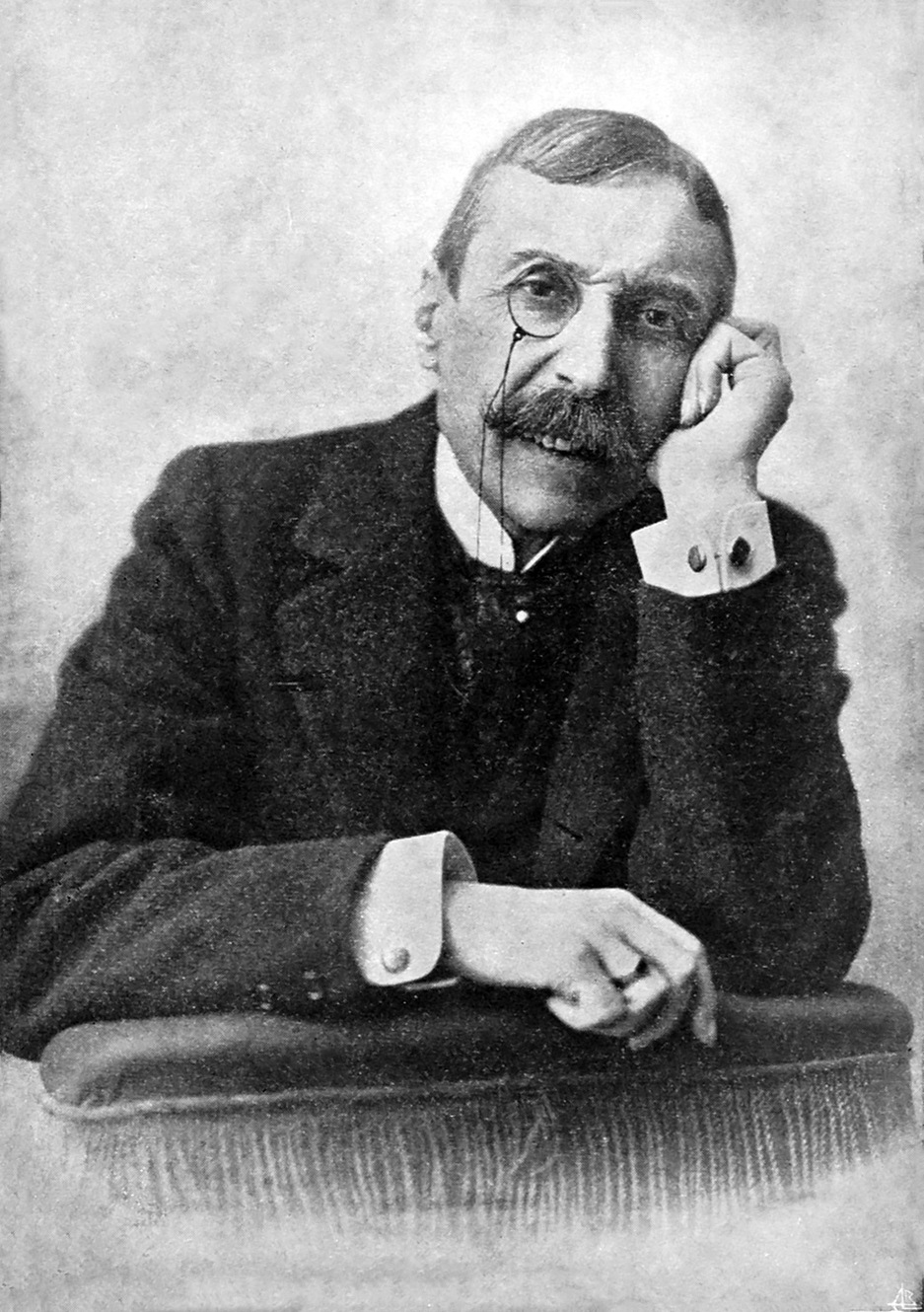
Eça de Queiroz.

Eça de Queiroz (1845–1900) was a Portuguese novelist. Born in Póvoa de Varzim, near Porto, he traveled throughout the world as a consul. He accepted an assignment to the consulate of Paris in 1888 and remained there until his death on August 16, 1900. The books he wrote in Paris are critical of Portuguese society. His most famous works include Os Maias (The Maias) (1878), O Crime do Padre Amaro (The Crime of Father Amaro) (1876) and O Primo Bazilio (Cousin Basílio) (1878). Nicknamed the "Portuguese Zola," Eça was the founder of Portuguese Naturalism.

In 2002, the Mexican director Carlos Carrera made a motion picture, "El Crimen del Padre Amaro" ("The Crime of Father Amaro"), adapted from Queirós' novel. One of the most successful Mexican films in history, it was also controversial because of its depiction of Catholic priesthood.

=== Fernando Pessoa ===
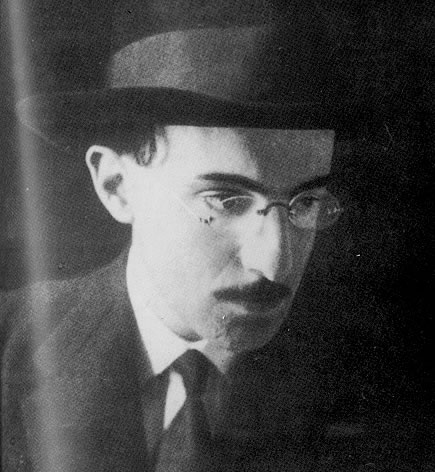
Fernando Pessoa.

Fernando Pessoa (1888–1935) was a Portuguese poet and prose writer. He used heteronyms, which allowed him to write in different styles not usually available to a poet. One of his most famous works was the epic-lyric poem "Mensagem" (Message).

Message discusses Sebastianism and Portuguese prophecies that arose after the death of Sebastian of Portugal in the Battle of Alcácer Quibir. The Portuguese await the return of the dead king on a foggy day – the return of the "National I" (Eu Nacional) that will take Portugal to govern the Fifth Empire.

=== Antero de Quental ===
Antero de Quental studied at the University of Coimbra, and soon distinguished himself by unusual talent, as well as turbulence and eccentricity. He began to write poetry at an early age primarily, though not entirely, devoting himself to the sonnet. After the publication of one volume of verse, he entered with great warmth into the revolt of the young men which dethroned António Feliciano de Castilho, the chief living poet of the elder generation, from his place as dictator over modern Portuguese literature. He then travelled, engaged on his return in political and socialistic agitations, and found his way through a series of disappointments to the mild pessimism, a kind of Western Buddhism, which animates his latest poetical productions. His melancholy was increased by a spinal disease, which after several years of retirement from the world drove him to suicide on his native island.

Antero stands at the head of modern Portuguese poetry after João de Deus. His principal defect is monotony: his own self is his solitary theme, and he seldom attempts any other form of composition than the sonnet. On the other hand, few poets who have primarily devoted themselves to this form have produced so large a proportion of really exquisite work. The comparatively few pieces in which be either forgets his doubts and inward conflicts, or succeeds in giving them an objective form, are among the most beautiful in any literature. The purely introspective sonnets are less attractive, but equally finely wrought, interesting as psychological studies, and impressive from their sincerity. His mental attitude is well described by himself as the effect of Germanism on the unprepared mind of a Southerner. He had learned much, and half-learned more, which he was unable to assimilate, and his mind became a chaos of conflicting ideas, settling down into a condition of gloomy negation, save for the one conviction of the vanity of existence, which ultimately destroyed him. A healthy participation in public affairs might have saved him, but he seemed incapable of entering upon any course that did not lead to delusion and disappointment. The great popularity acquired, notwithstanding, by poetry so metaphysical and egotistic is a testimony to the artistic instinct of the Portuguese.

As a prose writer Quental displayed high talents, though he wrote little. His most important prose work is the Considerações sobre a philosophia da historia literaria Portugueza, but he earned fame by his pamphlets on the Coimbra question, Bom senso e bom gosto, a letter to Castilho, and A dignidade das lettras e litteraturas officiaes.

His friend Oliveira Martins edited the Sonnets (Porto, 1886), supplying an introductory essay; and an interesting collection of studies on the poet by the leading Portuguese writers appeared in a volume entitled Anthero de Quental. In Memoriam (Oporto, 1896). The sonnets have been turned into most European languages; into English by Edgar Prestage (Anthero de Quental, Sixty-four Sonnets, London, 1894), together with a striking autobiographical letter addressed by Quental to his German translator, Dr Storck.

=== Alexandre O'Neill ===
Alexandre Manuel Vahía de Castro O’Neill (December 19, 1924 - August 21, 1986) was a Portuguese poet of Irish origin.

In 1948, O'Neill was among the founders of the Lisbon Surrealist Movement, along with Mário Cesariny de Vasconcelos, José-Augusto França and others. His writings soon diverged from surrealist to form an original style whose poetry reflects a love/hate relationship with his country.

His most salient characteristics– a disrespect of conventions, both social and literary, an attitude of permanent revolt, playfulness with language, and the use of parody and black humor – are used to form a body of incisive depictions of what it is to be Portuguese and throw light on his relation with the country.

O’Neill was in permanent conflict with Portugal. While other contemporaries wrote poems that protested against national life under Salazar, O’Neill's attack ran deeper. Poems such as ‘Standing at Fearful Attention’ and ‘Portugal’ suggested that the dictatorial regime was a symptom (the worst symptom) of graver ills– lack of courage and smallness of vision– woven into the nation's psyche. Other poems, such as ‘Lament of the Man Who Misses Being Blind’, seemed to hold religion and mysticism responsible for an obscurantism that made change difficult, if not impossible.

A publicist by profession, he is famous for inventing some of the most ingenious advertising slogans of his time, O’Neill was unusually adept at manipulating words and using them in an efficacious manner, but he refused to put that talent at the service of a lyrically lofty, feel-good sort of poetry (see ‘Simply Expressive’). Stridently anti-Romantic, and concerned about keeping humanity in its place as just one of earth's species, he did not believe that an especially harmonious world was possible, and he abhorred all attempts to escape the world, whether through mystical or poetical exaltations. His one hope, or consolation, explicitly stated in ‘St. Francis’s Empty Sandal’, was in the connection (never entirely peaceful) he felt with other members of the species.

Although most of his works are lost or confined to private collections, he was also a painter and a graphic composer of immense talent. Some of his work was shown, to great surprise and admiration, in 2002 at an exhibit on the surrealist movement.

=== José Saramago ===
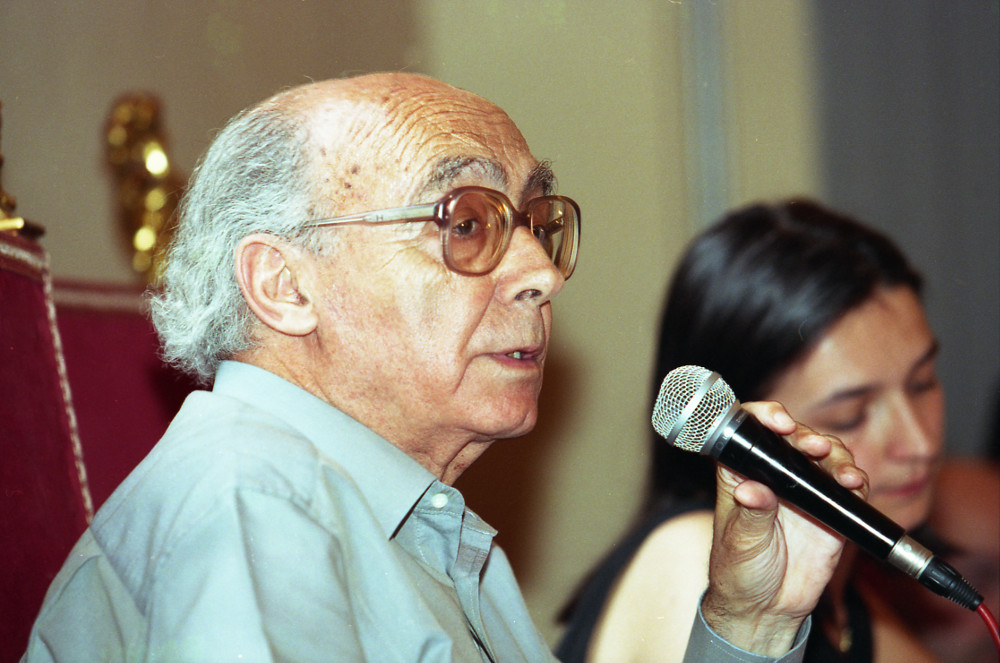
José Saramago in 1999.

José Saramago (1922–2010) was a Portuguese novelist who wrote works, such as "Memorial do Convento", and won the Nobel Prize in 1998.

== See also ==
- Angolan literature
- Brazilian literature
- Cape Verdean literature
- East Timorese literature
- Mozambican literature
- Literature of São Tomé and Príncipe
- Latin American literature
- List of libraries in Portugal
- List of Portuguese novelists
- List of Portuguese writers
- List of Brazilian writers
- Portuguese language
- Portuguese poetry
- Media of Portugal
