= Cancioneiro Geral =

The Cancioneiro Geral or Cancioneiro de Resende, published in 1516, is a compilation of courtly poetry gathered by the Evoran writer Garcia de Resende, which includes works from the 15th and 16th centuries.

== Characteristics ==
Cancioneiro Geral: cum privilegio/ ordered and edited by Garcia de Resende, nobleman of the house of the King our Lord and scribe of the Prince’s estate, Lisbon, Hernão de Campos, 1516.

The poems, mostly written in Portuguese but also in Spanish, cover a wide range of themes. It was the first printed collection of poetry in Portugal and the main repository of Portuguese poetry of the period. It is a good representation of the Castilian-Portuguese School.

The Cancioneiro follows the model of previous Castilian poem collections, such as the Cancionero de Baena from 1445 and the Cancionero Geral by Hernando del Castillo, published in 1511. Garcia de Resende (c.1470-1536), who was a poet, chronicler, and courtier at the court of King Manuel I, assembled almost a thousand poems by 286 authors, of which about 150 are in Spanish and the rest in Portuguese. The period of production of the poems ranges from the mid-15th century to the early 16th century. Unlike the Castilian Cancionero from 1511, the poems in the Portuguese work are not arranged thematically.

Resende's work was first published in 1516 in the workshop of Hermão de Campos and is dedicated to Prince João, the future John III of Portugal. The themes reveal a courtly poetry about daily life at court, along with other religious, amorous, and elegiac themes, as well as some attempts at epic poetry. Unlike in the troubadour period, when poetry was meant to be sung and danced, the poems of the Cancioneiro are self-contained, and rhythm is achieved through the sound of the words and the organization into verses and stanzas.

Among the many authors included are João Roiz de Castel-Branco, Sá de Miranda, Bernardim Ribeiro, and Garcia de Resende himself.

Regarding the Galician presence in the Cancioneiro, according to Isabel Morán, "The authors have as a reference the Galician-Portuguese Cancioneiros. And although there are no Galicians among the composers, there are Galician motifs of great interest... The treatment of the loves of the Galician Inês de Castro, which begin to gain strength as a preferred literary theme, and which Resende himself addresses; the mythification of Macías o Namorado or Juan Rodríguez de Padrón; and the presence of the Camino de Santiago".
