= Luís de Sousa (writer) =

Portuguese writer (1555–1632)

Frei Luís de Sousa (born Manoel or Manuel de Sousa Coutinho; 1555 – 5 May 1632) was a Portuguese monk and prose-writer, born at Santarém, a member of the noble family of Sousa Coutinho.

== Capture and release ==
In 1576, he broke off his studies at Coimbra University to join the order of Malta, and shortly afterwards was captured at sea by Barbary pirates and taken prisoner to Argel, where he met Cervantes. A year later, Manuel de Sousa Coutinho was ransomed, and landing on the coast of Aragon passed through Valencia, where he made the acquaintance of the poet Jaime Falcão, who seems to have inspired him with a taste for study and a quiet life.

The national disasters and family troubles increased his desire, which was confirmed when he returned to Portugal after the Battle of Alcácer Quibir. Between 1584 and 1586, he married a noble lady, Dona Magdalena de Vilhena, widow of Dom John of Portugal, the son of the poet Dom Manuel of Portugal, to whom Camões had dedicated his seventh ode.

== In Portugal ==
Settling at Almada, on the Tagus opposite Lisbon, he divided his time between domestic affairs, literary studies and his military duties as colonel of a regiment. His patriotic dislike of the Philippine Dynasty grew stronger as he saw Portugal exploited by her powerful partner, and it was ultimately brought to a head in 1599. In that year, to escape the pest that devastated Lisbon, the governors of the kingdom for Philip II decided to move their quarters to his residence; thereupon, finding his protest against this arbitrary resolution unheeded, he set fire to his house, and to escape the consequences of his courageous act had to leave Portugal.

== To Madrid ==
Going to Madrid, he not only escaped any penalty, owing no doubt to his position and influence at the Spanish court, but was able to pursue his literary studies in peace and to publish the works of his friend Jaime Falcão (Madrid, 1600).

Nothing is known of how he passed the next thirteen years, though there is a tradition that, at the instance of a brother resident in Panama, who held out the prospect of large commercial gains, he spent some time in America. It is said that fortune was unpropitious, and that this, together with the news of the death of his only child, Dona Anna de Noronha, caused his return home about 1604.

In 1613, he and his wife agreed to a separation, and he took the Dominican habit in the convent of Benfica, while Dona Magdalena entered the convent of the Sacramento at Alcantara. According to an old writer, the motive for their act was the news, brought by a pilgrim from Palestine that Dona Magdalena's first husband had survived the battle of Alcácer Quibir, in which he was supposed to have fallen, and still lived; Almeida Garrett has immortalized the legend in his 1843 play Frei Luís de Sousa. The story, however, deserves no credit, and a more natural explanation is that the pair took their resolution to leave the world for the cloister from motives of piety, though in the case of Manuel the captivity of his country and the loss of his daughter may have been contributory causes.

== Writing ==
He made his profession on 8 September 1614, and took the name by which he is known as a writer, Frei Luís de Sousa. In 1616, on the death of Frei Luís Cacegas, another notable Dominican who had collected materials for a history of the order and for a life of the famous archbishop of Braga, Dom Bartholomew of the Martyrs, the task of writing these books was confided to Frei Luís. The Life of the Archbishop appeared in 1619, and the first part of the Chronicle of St Dominic in 1623, while the second and third parts appeared posthumously in 1662 and 1678; in addition he wrote, by order of the government, the Annals of D. John III., which were published by Alexandre Herculano in 1846. After a life of about nineteen years spent in religion, he died on 5 May 1632, in Benfica, Lisbon, leaving behind him a memory of strict observance and personal holiness.

The Chronicle of St Dominic and the Life of the Archbishop have the defect of most monastic writings—they relate for the most part only the good, and exaggerate it without scruple, and they admit all sorts of prodigies, so long as these tend to increase devotion. Briefly, these books are panegyrics, written for edification, and are not histories at all in the critical sense of the word. They include a lucid, polished style, purity of diction, and simple, vivid descriptions. His metaphors are well chosen, and he employs on appropriate occasions familiar terms and locutions, and makes full use of those diminutives in which the Portuguese language is rich. His prose is characterized by elegance, sweetness and strength, and is free from the affectations and false rhetoric that characterized the age.

== Poetry ==
In addition to his other gifts, Frei Luís de Sousa was a good Latin poet. There are many editions of the Life of the Archbishop, and it appeared in French (Paris, 1663, 1679 and 1825), in Italian (1727–1728), in Spanish (Madrid, 1645 and 1727) and in English (London, 1890). The História de S. Domingos may be read in a modern edition (6 vols, Lisbon, 1866).

== Authorities ==
- Obras de D. Francisco Alexandre Lobo, ii. 6f 171
- Inocêncio Francisco da Silva, Dicionário Bibliográfico Português, v. 327, xvi. 72
- Sousa Viterbo, Manoel de Sousa Coulinho (Lisbon, 1902).
