= Torrão =

- Civil parish
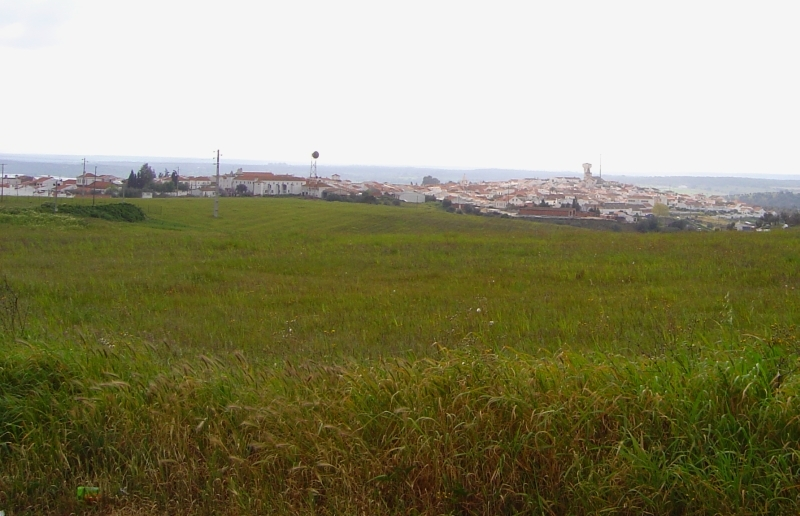
- Torrão seen from the Hermitage of Nossa Senhora do Bom Sucesso

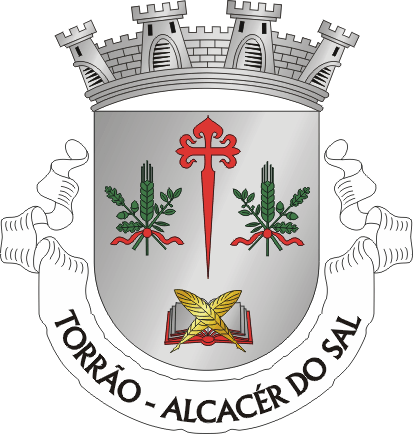
- Coat of arms

- Location in Portugal
- Coordinates: 38.295°N 8.224°W
- Country: Portugal
- Region: Alentejo
- Intermunic. comm.: Alentejo Litoral
- District: Setúbal
- Municipality: Alcácer do Sal

Area
  - Total: 372.39 km^{2} (143.78 sq mi)

Population (2011)
  - Total: 2,295
  - Density: 6.163/km^{2} (15.96/sq mi)
- Time zone: UTC+00:00 (WET)
  - Summer (DST): UTC+01:00 (WEST)
- Postal code: 7595
- Area code: 265
- Patron: Nossa Senhora da Assunção
- Website: http://www.torrao.freguesias.pt/

Torrão (European Portuguese: [tuˈʁɐ̃w]) is a civil parish and town, in the municipality of Alcácer do Sal, in the Portuguese district of Setúbal, bordering on the districts of Évora and the Beja. It is crossed by the Xarrama River. The population in 2011 was 2,295, in an area of 372.39 km^{2}.

In 2012, Torrão was, in terms of area, the third-largest parish in Portugal but, due to a territorial reorganization, since 2013 has been the sixth-largest parish in the country.

== History ==
Human presence can be traced back to the late Neolithic or Chalcolithic from excavations made at Monte da Tumba in the early 1980s.

In December 1895 the archeologist José Leite de Vasconcelos discovered various constructs, including dolmens (such as the Dolman of Torrão), that were in various states (some on the ground, others upright and inclined). Along with other sites, Pedra de Anta suggests the existence of many megalithic monuments in this region, but their absence may indicate that the large stones may have been repurposed for other purposes. The dolmen Lapa de São Fausto (locally referred to as Fráusto or Fragusto) was named after a saint who had supposedly appeared on the site. Near this site are the ruins of a church (dated to its reconstruction in 1645), but where Pinho Leal referred to the existence of a Roman temple, dedicated to Jupiter. J. Leite de Vasconcelos had authored studies claiming the discovery of Neolithic instruments, which designated: "instruments of copper and bronze".

From the Roman epoch, the eminent archaeologist noted a small construction on the outskirts of the village, that could have served to collect water, and roof tile fragments scattered around the structure. Today a modernist fountain, at the time the spring was referred to as Fonte Santa, and had been rumoured to have originated by the Arab residents of the region. Older records from the local prior date from 1758, and referring to Torrão indicate: "I do not know if there's a spring or celebrated lake, yes, a fountain called Fonte Santa,...and they say that it is a work of the Moors, which they do not doubt, because the land smells of them, and we can see that the majority of the people are black and disguised, or now like charcoal". The Arab occupation of the region ended with the reconquest of Alcácer do Sal in 1217, when the territories in the shadow of the town was conquered.

In São João de Azinhais was a tombstone with inscription, and barrel-like stone, use for burials in the Alentejo at the time. These mounds, conform Romanesque practices, mark the beginnings of Christian occupation. After the Reconquista the seigneury was handed over to the Order of Saint James (under the patronage of the Church of Santa Maria), beginning a period of ownership since 1260, and establishing its municipal history. The village was actually larger near the hermitage of São Roque for a time, owing to the number of foundations, but may have been disseminated by the effects of the Black Death.

== Geography ==
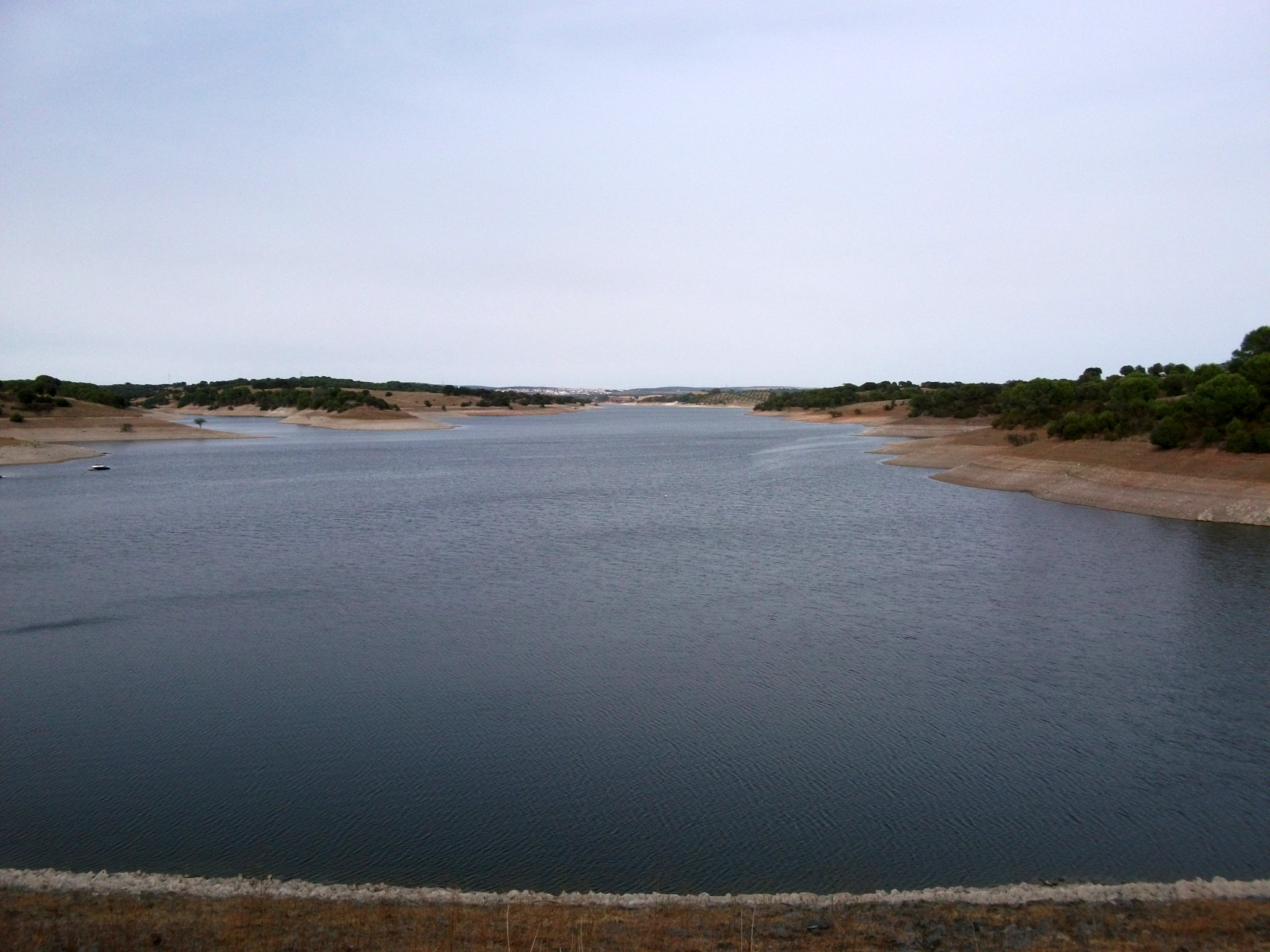
Trigo de Morais Reservoir

Torrão is one of six parish of Alcácer do Sal, located southeast of this municipality, in the south part of the Setúbal District.

It's in the limits of this parish that stand united the Setúbal, Évora and Beja districts and therefore the NUTS III Alentejo Litoral, Alentejo Central e Baixo Alentejo.

Torrão has borders with the Viana do Alentejo municipality, in the northeast, from the Évora district, by Alvito, east and Ferreira do Alentejo, south, in the Beja district and Grândola, south and west, also in the district of Setúbal.

The parish is divided by the Xarrama River, on is way to meet the Sado River. In this path, just after passing the village of Torrão, the Xarrama forms an artificial lake, created by the Vale do Gaio Dam.

== Economy ==
From Torrão can be originated several geographical indications and traditional specialities:

- Protected designation of origin (PDO)
  - Olive oil: Azeite do Alentejo Interior (DOP)
  - Cheese: Queijo Serpa (DOP).
  - Cattle:
    - Carnalentejana (DOP)
    - Carne da Charneca (DOP)
    - Carne Mertolenga (DOP)
  - Pigs:
    - Carne de Porco Alentejano (DOP) (Meat from Black Iberian pig)
    - Presunto do Alentejo (DOP) and Paleta do Alentejo (DOP)
- Protected geographical indication (PGI)
  - Wine: Península de Setúbal (IGP)
  - Sheep: Borrego do Baixo Alentejo (IGP)
  - Goat: Cabrito do Alentejo (IGP)
  - Pigs:
    - Presunto de Campo Maior e Elvas (IGP) and Paleta de Campo Maior e Elvas (IGP)
    - Presunto de Santana da Serra (IGP) and Paleta de Santana da Serra (IGP)

== Architecture ==
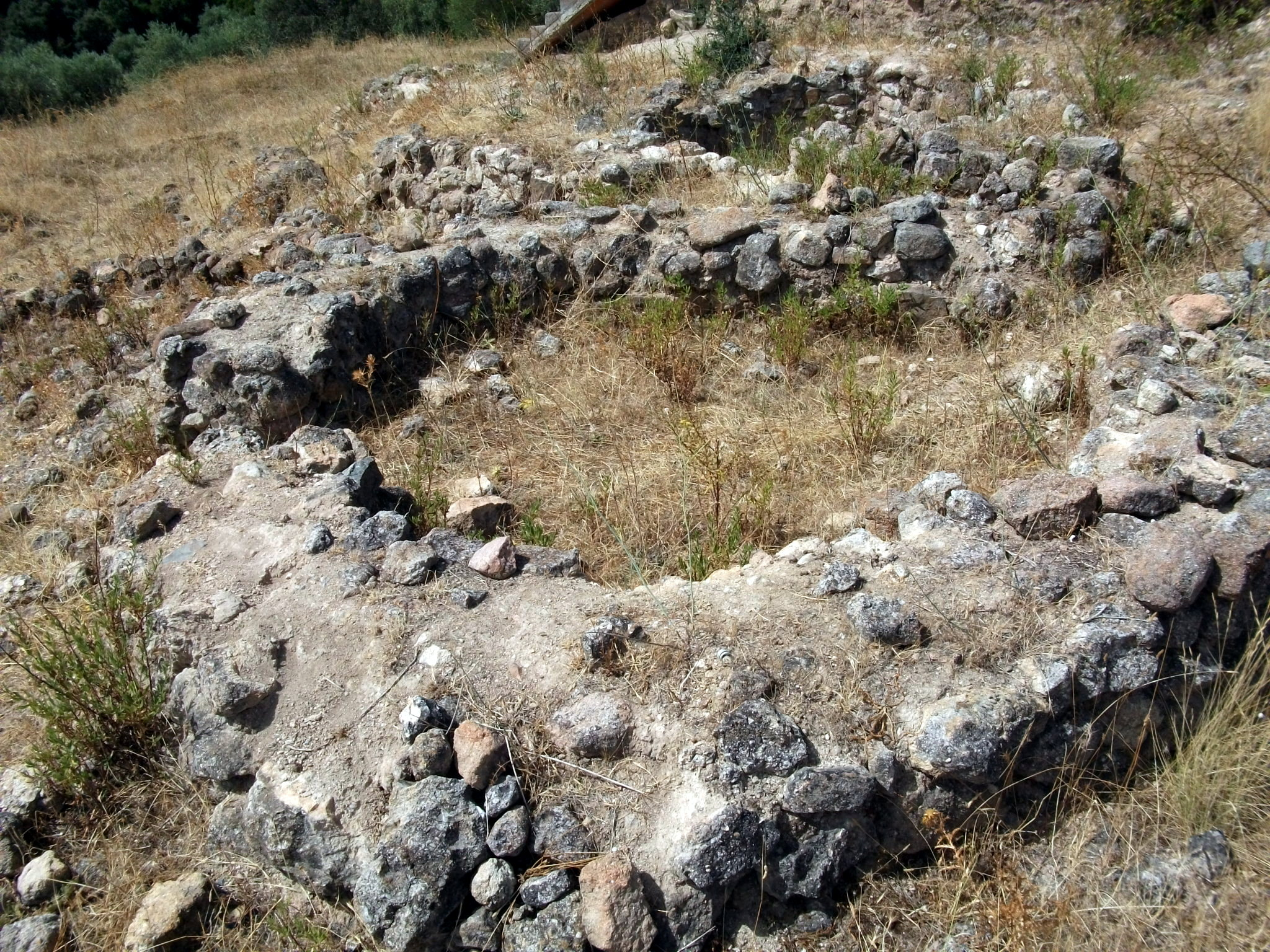
The remnants of the pre-historic castros of Torrão

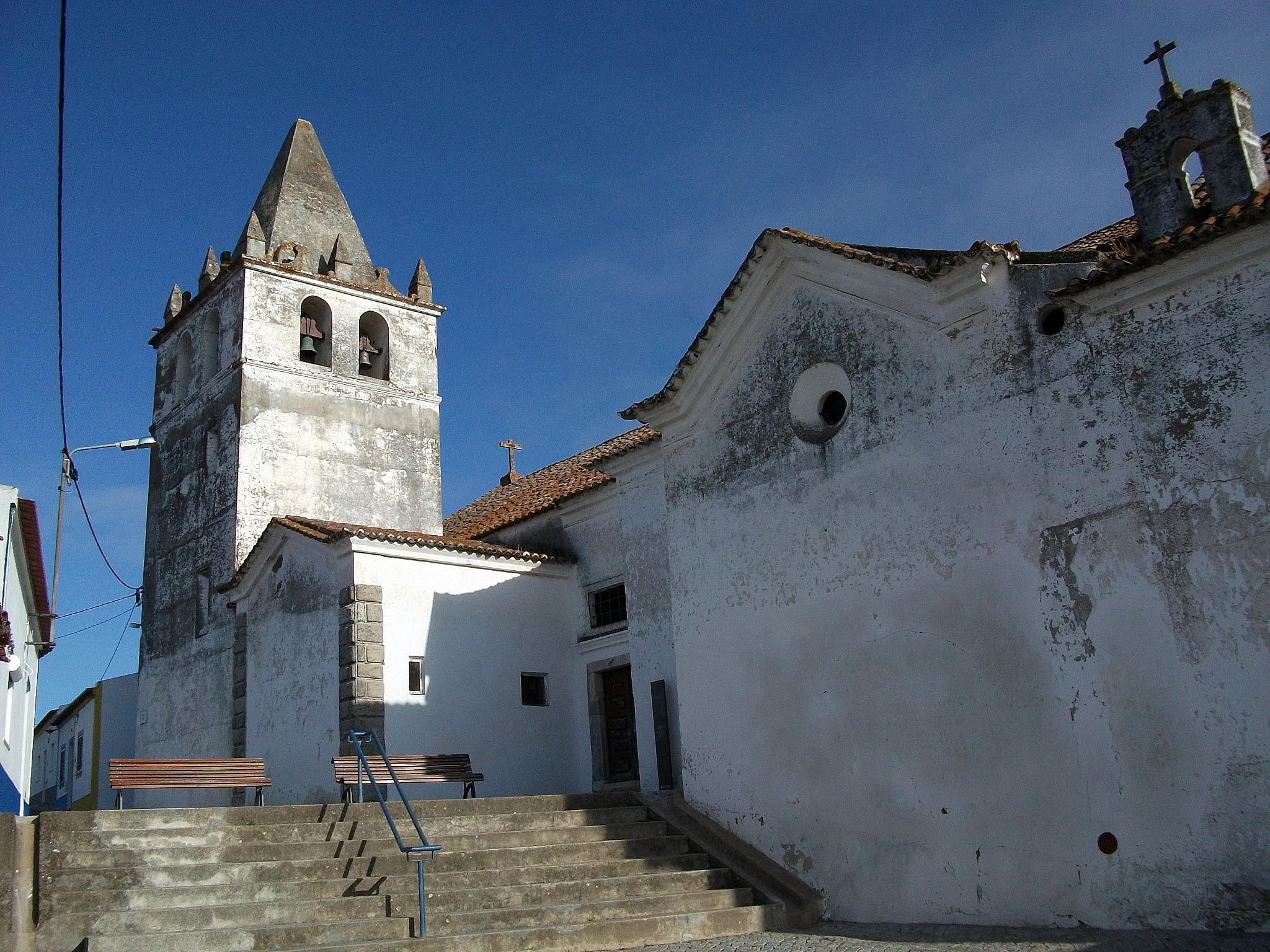
The 17th century belltower of the Church of Our Lady of the Assumption, south facade and belltower

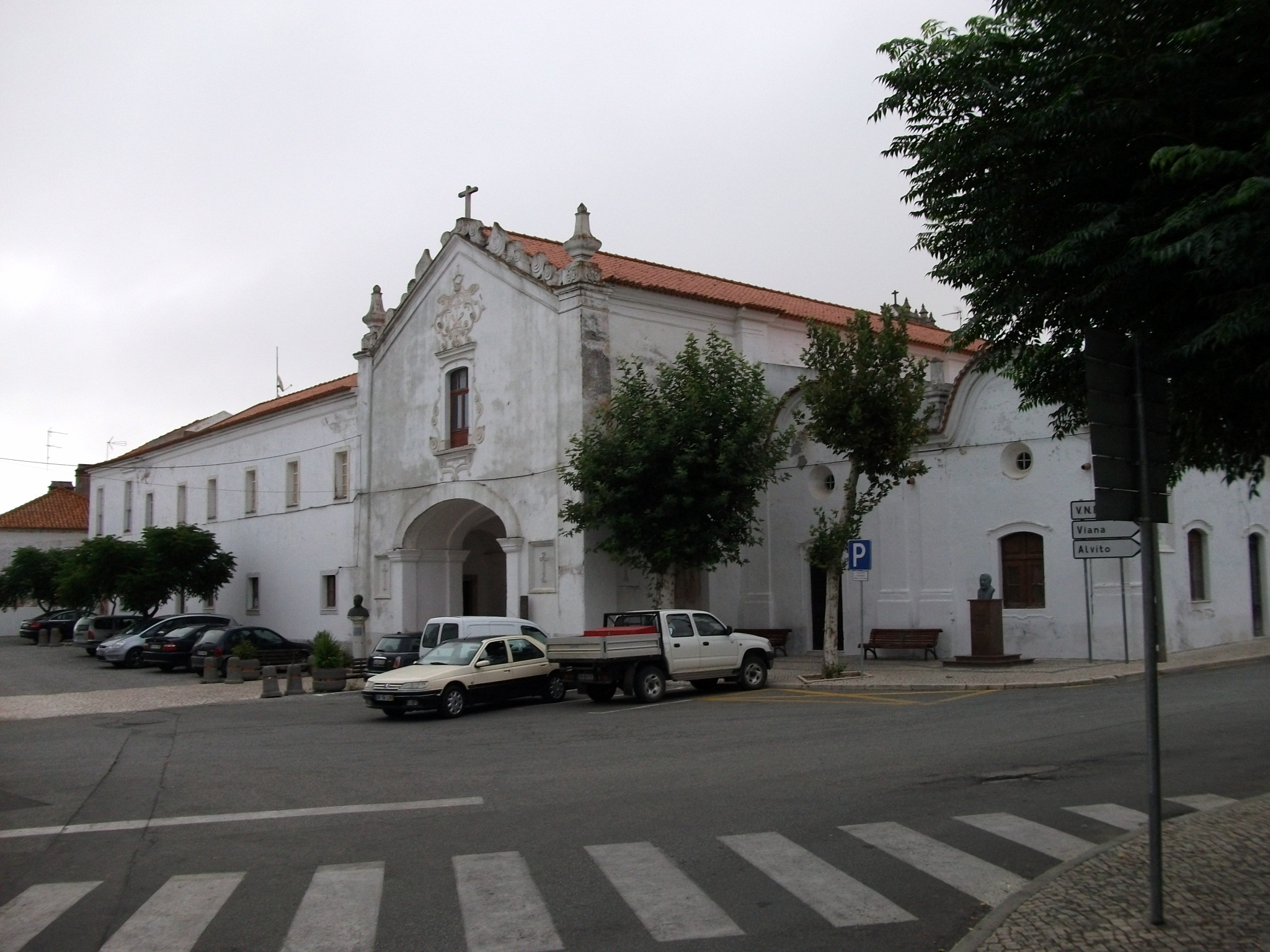
The front facade of the Convent of São Francisco

=== Archeological ===
- Monte da Tumba, the first vestiges of a settlement in Torrão, these Neolithic to Calcolithic remnants, are primarily circular stones and a defensive wall, excavated after 1980. Classified as a site in the public interest in 2013.

=== Civic ===
- Dam of Vale do Gaio (Portuguese: Barragem Vale do Gaio)
- Small Roman road of Torrão (Portuguese: Calçadinha Romana), this "small" 2.4-metre (7.9 ft) road consists of a layer of interlocked stone over a crushed dirt, laterally inclined to allow for drainage: it was constructed sometime in the 1st century.

=== Religious ===
- Church of Nossa Senhora da Assunção (Portuguese: Igreja Paroquial do Torrão/Igreja de Nossa Senhora da Assunção), dedicated to Our Lady of the Assumption, the simple, austere church was constructed in the first quarter of the 16th century, and pertained to the Order of Saint James (Portuguese: Ordem de Santiago), situated alongside the palace of Grande Master D. Jorge and the walls of his castle. Classified as a monument in the public interest in 1933. In the interior, the walls are plastered with 16th-century Mannerist azulejo tile, with an image of the archangel Michael, and gilded plaster in the National style cover the rostrum (although absent from the rest of the retable).
- Chapel of São João dos Azinhais (Portuguese: Capela de São João dos Azinhais/Capela de Arranas), built in 682 (during the reign of the Visigothic king Ervígio, this chapel was built on a smaller temple dedicated to the martyred saints Justo and Pastor. Classified as a monument in the public interest in 2013. Constructed in the Portuguese "Chão"-style Baroque architecture, the chapel consists of a single-nave constructed of Roman arches, and supported by thick lateral buttresses.
- Chapel of São João Napomoceno (Portuguese: Capela de São João Napomoceno/Capela de São João da Ponte), the small single-name chapel, erected in the 18th century, includes small belfry in the front portico and pinnacles on all corners;
- Convent of Nossa Senhora da Graça Portuguese: Convento de Nossa Senhora da Graça/Convento de Clarissas do Torrão/Convento das Freiras), consecrated to the Virgin Mary by D. Brites Pinto, this convent was established in 1560 to shelter homeless women. The later Franciscan convent was damaged during the 1755 Lisbon earthquake, but continued to operate until 1834 (after the expulsion of the religious orders), when it was sold and acquired by local family. Since then, the annexes and rooms were used for various activities until 1996, when a request was made to transform the complex into a rural tourism destination;
- Convent of São Francisco (Portuguese: Convento de Santo António/Igreja e Convento de São Francisco), a mixture of architectural styles that include Mannerist, Chã, Baroque, Joanina, Neoclassical and Pomboline, this convent dedicated to Saint Francis of Assisi consists of irregular volumes that include an ornate church with elaborate chancel and retable decorated in gilded plaster and woodwork, and 17th-century azulejo tile. Classified as a monument in the public interest on 18 September 2012, it was constructed in the 16th century, elaborated in 1737 and starting in 1968 remodelled by the Diocese of Grandôla and Municipal Council;
- Hermitage of Nossa Senhora do Bom Sucesso (Portuguese: Ermida de Nossa Senhora do Bom Sucesso e a casa dos romeiros), King Manuel first ordered the erection of a house of worship in the site in the 16th century, but it was King John V of Portugal who licensed the brothers of the Confraria de Nossa Senhora do Bom Sucesso (whose seat was the Chapel of São João Baptista in Torrão), to construct a hermitage. Classified as a monument in the public interest in 2012, What was constructed on the site was a hermitage in the Portuguese Chão style, that included a single-story building decorated in its interior by painted ceiling fresco and altar chancel of gilded plaster, through an equally ornate Roman arch.

== Notable citizens ==
- Bernardim Ribeiro (1482–1552), a Renaissance Portuguese poet and writer born in Torrão
- Maria Rosa Colaço (1935–2004), a Portuguese teacher, writer, and journalist born in Torrão
