= Frei Luís de Sousa =

Play by Almeida Garrett

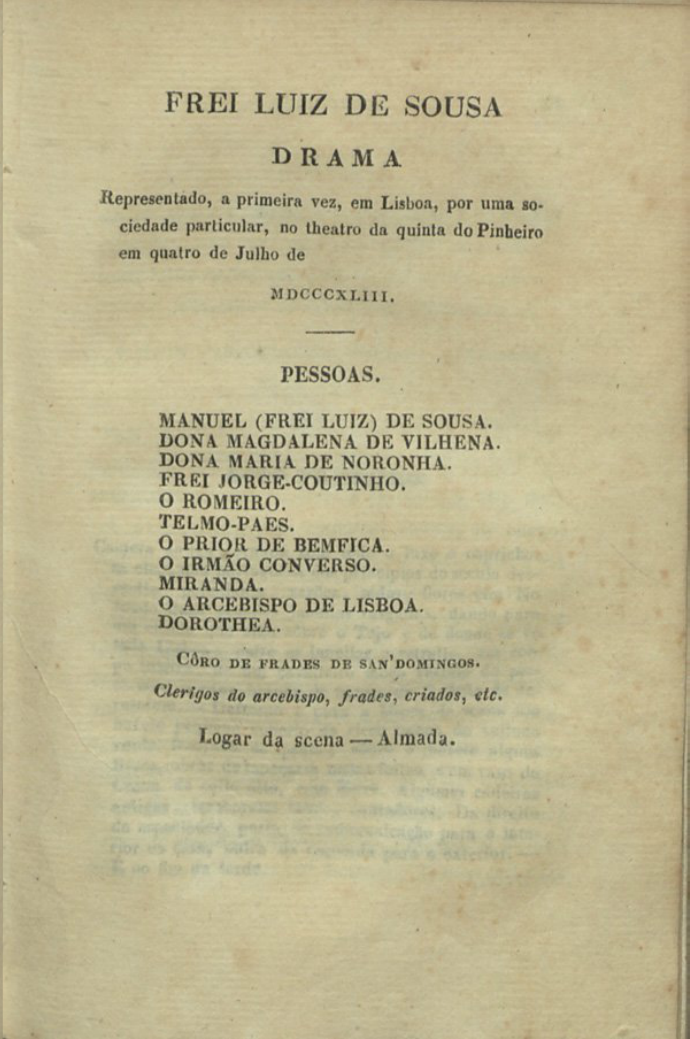
- Dramatis personæ on the first published edition of Frei Luís de Sousa, 1844
- Characters: Manuel de Sousa Coutinho; Madalena de Vilhena; Maria de Noronha; Frei Jorge Coutinho; The Pilgrim; Telmo Pais; The Prior of Benfica; Lay Brother; Miranda; The Archbishop of Lisbon; Doroteia
- Original language: Portuguese
- Setting: Almada, 1599

Premiere
- Date premiered: 4 July 1843
- Place premiered: Lisbon, Portugal

Frei Luís de Sousa (Note: Originally published as Frei Luiz de Sousa, the standard spelling in the 19th century.) is a play in three acts by Portuguese playwright Almeida Garrett, premiered on 4 July 1843 and first published the following year. A classic tragedy, it is loosely based on the true story of a 16th-century nobleman who, after being presumed killed in battle, returns to Portugal under Spanish rule, to the consternation of his wife who has since remarried.

Frei Luís de Sousa is considered Almeida Garrett's dramatic masterpiece and the archetype of Portuguese Romantic theatre. José-Augusto França has called Frei Luís de Sousa "the masterpiece of 19th-century Portuguese theatre", and João Gaspar Simões notes that it is "easily the foremost document of national theatre."

It has been adapted into the English language as The Pilgrim.

== Plot summary ==
The play is set in Portugal under Spanish dominion, many years after the disastrous Battle of Ksar el-Kebir that cost Portugal its independence. The body of the Portuguese king, Sebastian of Portugal, was never recovered, nor was that of nobleman Dom João de Portugal, of the important House of Vimioso.

Madalena de Vilhena, Dom João de Portugal's widow, has since married Manuel de Sousa Coutinho, a chivalrous knight of the Order of Malta. The two lead a virtuous and happy existence, along with their frail young daughter, Maria de Noronha, perturbed only by the silent reproach of a loyal servant, Telmo Pais, the only one who still believes that his former master is alive and shall one day return. Madalena has since grown anguished that the possibility of Dom João's return would mean her second marriage is bigamous, void, and that her daughter Maria is illegitimate.

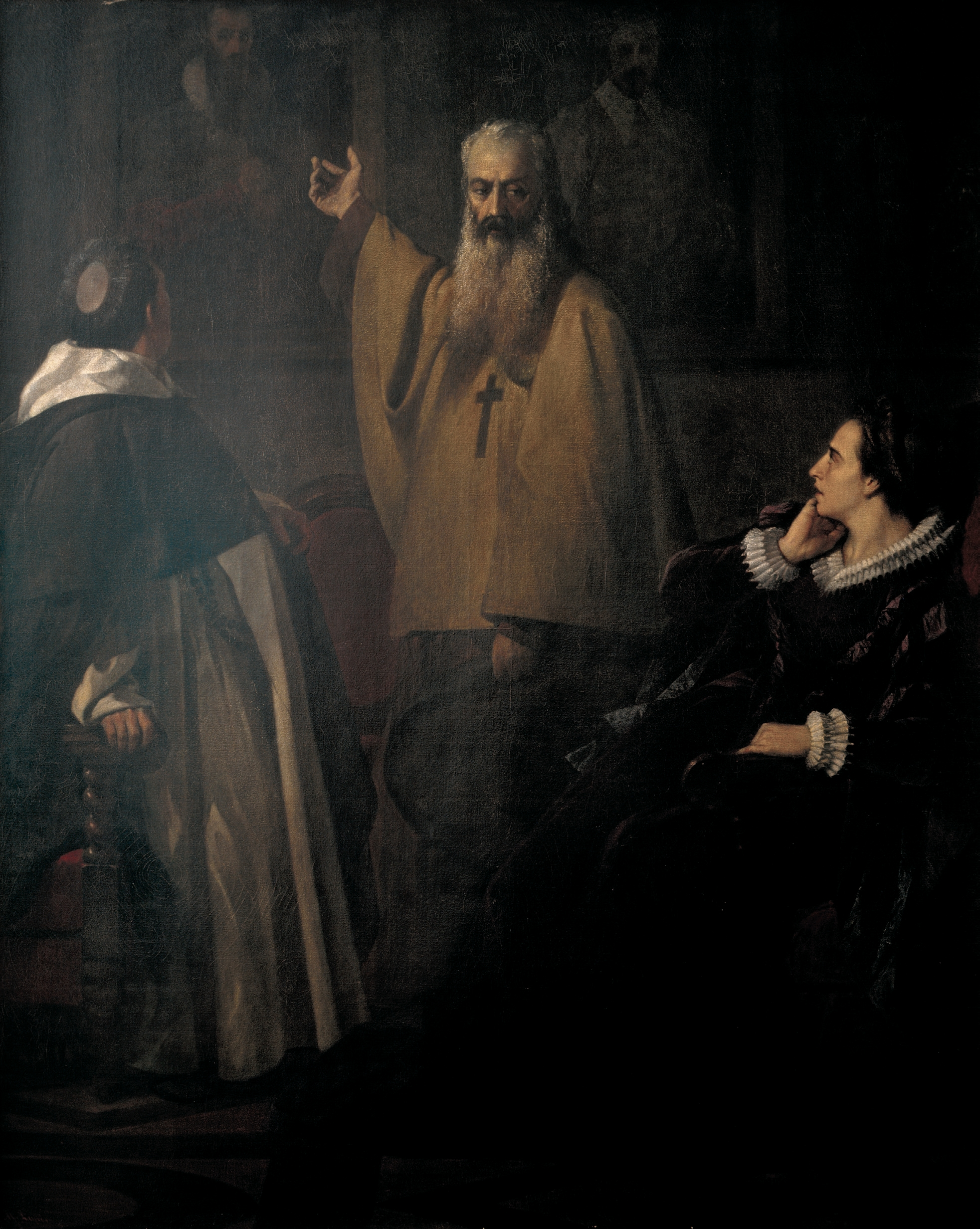
Dom João de Portugal (1863), by Miguel Ângelo Lupi (Chiado Museum)

They live in Manuel de Sousa Coutinho's elegant palace in Almada, and receive word that the Spanish governors, driven from a plague-devastated Lisbon, have decided to move their quarters to the residence: appalled by this arbitrary resolution and in a fit of patriotism, Manuel de Sousa Coutinho sets fire to his own house. While they abandon the ablaze palace, Madalena watches as a portrait of Manuel is consumed by the flames.

The circumstances dictate the family is now forced to live in the old, uninhabited palace that used to belong to Madalena's first husband, Dom João de Portugal. The gallery of the old palace is dominated by a portrait of Dom João besides another of King Sebastian — which Madalena interprets as a grave omen. While Maria and Manuel de Sousa Coutinho are away, Madalena is being settled by her brother-in-law, Frei Jorge, when they receive the visit of an old pilgrim from the Holy Land: he tells them that he was kept in captivity for many years and that he knows for a fact that Dom João is still alive. When asked who he is, the pilgrim replies "No one" as he points to Dom João's portrait.

Deathly ashamed, Madalena and Manuel de Sousa decide that the only solution was for them to go their separate ways and each join a convent. Telmo Pais tells the pilgrim, who he recognises as Dom João, about the frail young Maria de Noronha, and the old nobleman regrets his mere presence causes the family such distress and is covering the woman he loved in dishonour: he bids Telmo to go and tell them all that the pilgrim was a fraud, but it is too late — the play concludes as Manuel de Sousa (now, Brother Luís de Sousa) and Madalena take their solemn vows to live cloistered monastic lives. The now-orphaned Maria de Noronha interrupts the ceremony in an emotional and feverish speech about how the social mores have torn their family apart before she succumbs to consumption.

== History ==
According to a scribble at the end of the play's manuscript, Almeida Garrett finished it "in the morning of 8 April 1843, in bed, in this house in rua do Alecrim". He presented it to the Royal Conservatory of Lisbon in a conference held on 6 May 1843, declaiming it in full by himself, along with an important address (Memória ao Conservatório Real), a theorizing text, with reflections on literature and theatre and on the pedagogic mission of the artist — in it, he famously notes that Frei Luís de Sousa has all the hallmarks of a tragedy, however, he prefers to call it a drama because it does not follow the formal structure of a tragedy. Garrett's Memória is sometimes compared to the preface of Victor Hugo's 1827 play Cromwell, now considered the manifesto of the Romanticism, in terms of importance as a declaration of aesthetic intentions of the incipient Romantic movement in Portugal.

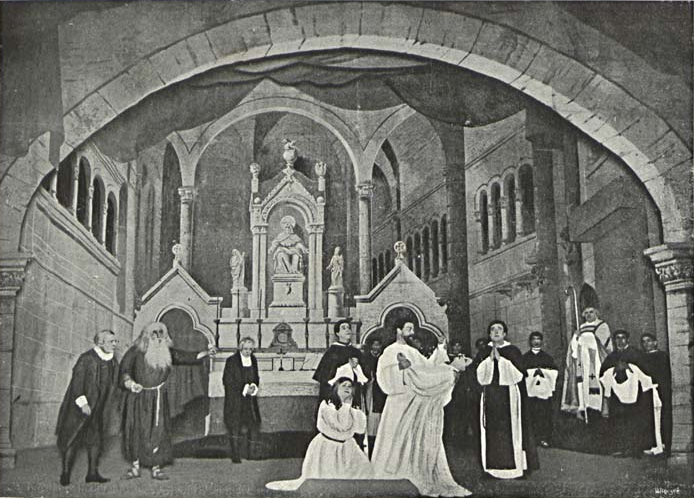
The final scene of Frei Luís de Sousa in a 1908 performance, Príncipe Real Theatre

The favourable impressions of his peers at the Conservatory led Garrett to present the play to the public. The play was first performed before an audience on 4 July 1843, in the private Quinta do Pinheiro Theatre in Lisbon; Almeida Garrett himself played the part of Telmo Pais. The first public showing, in the Salitre Theatre in the summer of 1847, was of a severely censured version, especially the end of Act I, considered a "diplomatic complication" with Spain: a contemporary article published in the Revista Universal Lisbonense described it as having turned "the most exemplary and admirable of our dramas into a shapeless monster". The full play only premiered in the National Theatre in 1850.

Edgar Prestage translated the play as Brother Luiz de Sousa, published 1909. In the 1990s, Nicholas Round made an adaptation for the stage titled The Pilgrim.
