= Cristóvão Falcão =

Portuguese writer (c. 1512 – c. 1557)

Cristóvão Falcão (c. 1512 – c. 1557), sometimes Cristóvão Falcão de Sousa or Cristóvão de Sousa Falcão, was a Portuguese poet, that came of a noble family settled at Portalegre in the Alentejo, which had originated with John Falconet, one of the Englishmen who went to Portugal in 1386 in the suite of Philippa of Lancaster. His father, João Vaz de Almada Falcão, was an upright public servant who had held the captaincy of Elmina on the West African coast, but died, as he had lived, a poor man.

There is a tradition that in boyhood Cristóvão fell in love with a beautiful child and rich heiress, D. Maria Brandão, and in 1526 married her clandestinely, but parental opposition prevented the ratification of the marriage. Family pride, it is said, drove the father of Cristóvão to keep his son under strict surveillance in his own house for five years, while the lady's parents, objecting to the youth's small means, put her into the Cistercian convent of Lorvão, and there endeavoured to wean her heart from him by the accusation that he coveted her fortune more than her person. Their arguments and the promise of a good match ultimately prevailed, and in 1534 D. Maria left the convent to marry D. Luís de Silva, captain of Tangier, while the broken-hearted Cristóvão told his sad story in some beautiful lyrics and particularly in the eclogue Chrisfal.

He had been the disciple and friend of the poets Bernardim Ribeiro and Francisco de Sá de Miranda, and when his great disappointment came, Falcão laid aside poetry and entered on a diplomatic career. There is documentary evidence that he was employed at the Portuguese embassy in Rome in 1542, but he soon returned to Portugal, and we find him at court again in 1548 and 1551. The date of his death, as of his birth, is uncertain.

Such is the story accepted by Teófilo Braga, but Delfim Guimarães shows that the first part is doubtful, and, putting aside the testimony of a contemporary and grave writer, Diogo do Couto, he even denies the title of poet to Cristóvão Falcão, arguing from internal and other evidence that Chrisfal is the work of Bernardim Ribeiro; his destructive criticism is, however, stronger than his constructive work. The eclogue, with its 1005 verses, is the very poem of saudade, and its simple, direct language and chaste and tender feeling, enshrined in exquisitely sounding verses, has won for its author lasting fame and a unique position in Portuguese literature. Its influence on later poets has been very considerable, and Camões used several of the verses as proverbs.

The poetical works of Cristóvão Falcão were published anonymously, owing, it is supposed, to their personal nature and allusions, and, in part or in whole, they have been often reprinted. There is a critical edition of Chrisfal and A Carta (the letter) by Epiphandro da Silva Dias under the title Obras de Christovão Falcão, (Porto, 1893), and one of the Cantigas Esparsas by the same scholar appeared in the Revista Lusitana (vol. 4, pp. 142-f 79, Lisbon, 1896), under the name Fragmento de um Cancioneiro do Século XV. The Trovas de Chrisfal, in what appears to be the earliest known version, consists of 1015 verses. This text, though known earlier, was finally edited in 1995 (by Rip Cohen), all previous editions having been based on the edition of Ferrara.
