= Sermon of Saint Anthony to the Fish =

Preach by António Vieira in Brazil

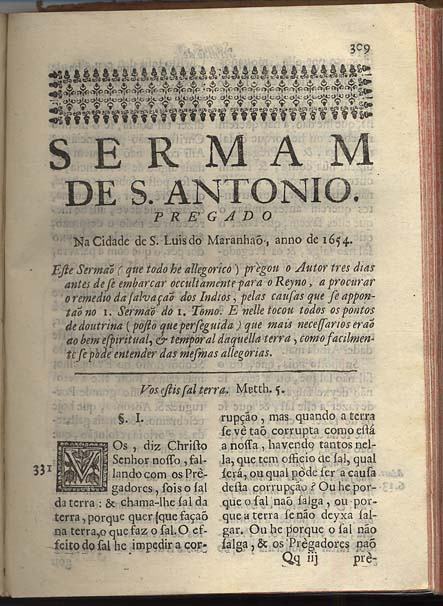
- First published edition (Lisbon, 1682), in a collection of António Vieira's sermons.
- Author: António Vieira
- Original title: Sermão de Santo António aos Peixes
- Language: Portuguese
- Genre: Sermon
- Publication date: 1682
- Publication place: Portugal

The "Sermon of Saint Anthony to the Fish" (Portuguese: Sermão de Santo António aos Peixes) is a sermon written by Portuguese Jesuit priest António Vieira, preached to the congregation at the Church of Saint Anthony in São Luís do Maranhão, Colonial Brazil, on 13 June 1654. It is Vieira's most famous work.

It was preached in the context of the conflict between the colony's settlers and the Jesuits, who reiterated Pope Urban VIII's prohibition against Indian slavery. Three days after preaching it, Vieira secretly embarked to Lisbon to appeal King John IV for laws that would guarantee basic rights to Brazilian Indians, preventing them from being exploited by white colonists.

The sermon comprises an elaborate allegory: borrowing from the familiar legend of his namesake Saint Anthony's preaching to the fish (commonly cited in his hagiography), Vieira uses the different kinds of fish as metaphors for men, drawing direct parallels between the dynamics between big and little fish and those between colonists and the Indians.

== Historical context ==
The Jesuit Father Vieira arrived in Maranhão, Colonial Brazil, in early 1653, at a time prudence recommended his departure from the royal court in Lisbon, where his success, freedom of speech and reforming zeal had earned him several powerful enemies. Vieira made great efforts to convert the African slaves and indigenous peoples of Brazil, but soon found every difficulty was placed in his way by the colonial authorities: they not only set the wrong example with the scandalous sins of war, adultery, concubinage, blasphemy, but, more importantly, they profited hugely from their exploitation of the enslaved natives.

The Jesuits in the colony wished to evangelize the natives, for which it was imperative to spare them a destructive servitude. Conflicts between the settlers and the Jesuits in Brazil went back as far as 1549, and were to last until the latter were banished in 1760.

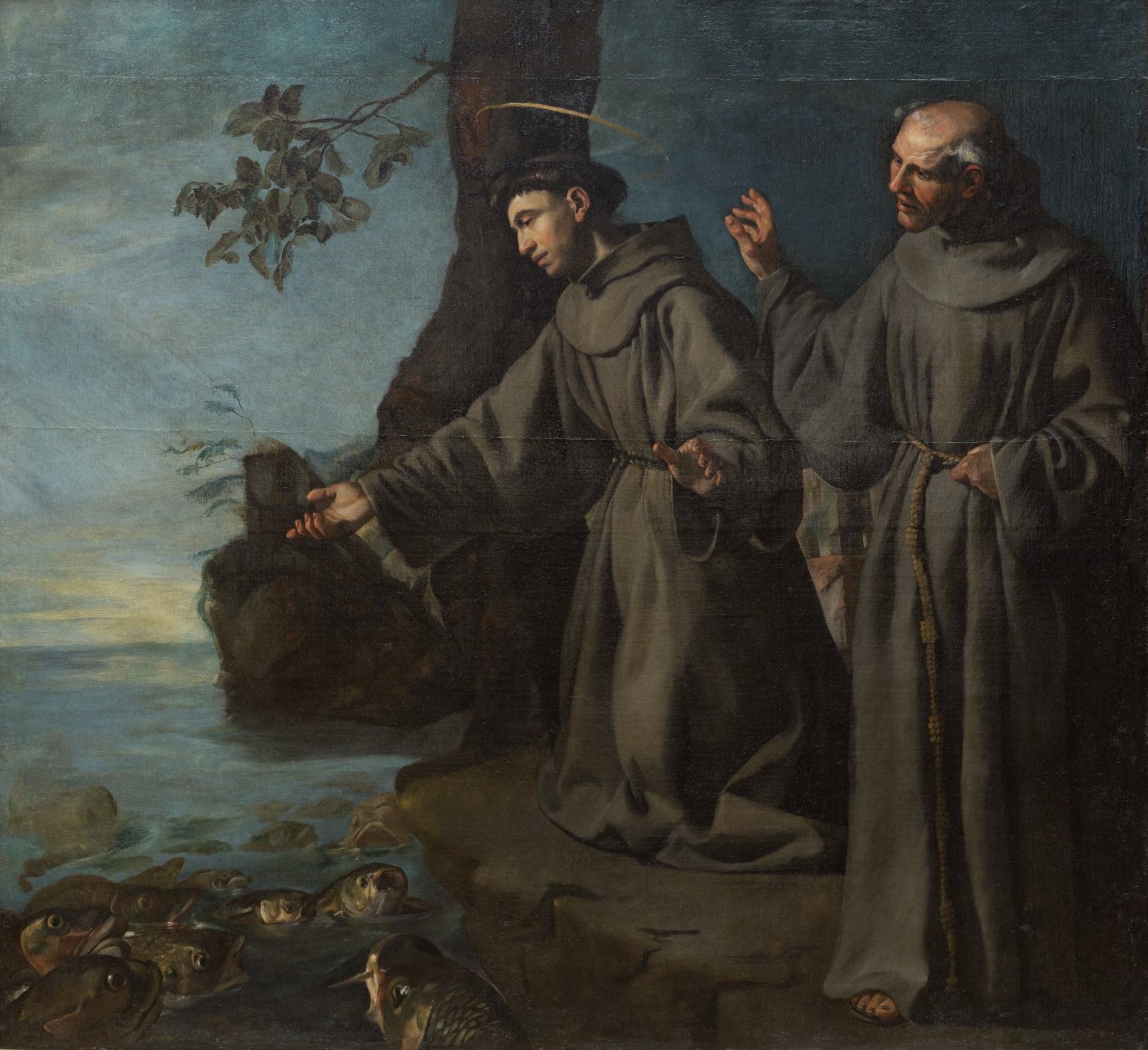
Saint Anthony Preaching to the Fishes, c. 1630, attributed to Francisco de Herrera the Elder (Detroit Institute of Arts)

Vieira used his renowned oratory skills to preach against the enslavement of the Indians. On 13 June 1654 he preached the Sermon of Saint Anthony to the Fish in the Church of Saint Anthony in São Luís do Maranhão. It is not merely incidental that Vieira chose Saint Anthony of Lisbon as his subject: not only it was the saint's feast day, but the Portuguese saint traveled widely and was noted for his great learning and oratory, not unlike Vieira.

Saint Anthony's hagiography includes the legendary episode of the Sermon of the Fishes: while preaching to the heretics at Rimini who derided him, the saint turned instead to the seashore and began to preach to the fishes on their predatory nature; the fishes miraculously came at his call, and remained with their heads out of the water until he had finished speaking and gave them his blessing. Instead of, as expected, commenting on the saint's apostolic virtue having the day's Gospel as a starting point, Vieira instead satirised his disenchantment with the colonists and their vices by making allusions to their faults in the characteristics of different types of fish, in a direct imitation of Saint Anthony: "But for many days now it has been in my thoughts that, on the feast days of the Saints, it is better to preach like them than to preach about them. All the more so since the salt of my doctrine, whatever it is, has had in this city a fortune so similar to that of Saint Anthony in Rimini that it is necessary to follow him in everything."

Vieira saw, however, that the state of affairs was unsustainable and that the natives must be withdrawn from the jurisdiction of the governors, to prevent their exploitation, and placed under the control of the members of the religious society. Accordingly, three days later, Vieira secretly set sail for Lisbon to plead the cause of the Indians, and in April 1655 he obtained from King John IV a series of decrees which placed the missions under the Society of Jesus, with Vieira himself as their superior, and prohibited the enslavement of the natives, except in certain specific cases.

== Summary ==
The structure of the Sermon follows the Ciceronian tradition: an introduction presenting the theme (exordium) ending in an invocation to the Virgin Mary as the Domina maris; the main body of the sermon, allegorical in nature, wherein are Vieira's arguments and counterarguments (narratio and confirmatio); and the conclusion (peroratio).

The theme of the Sermon comes from the Gospel of Matthew: "Vos estis sal terræ" (Matt. 5:13). After the theme exposition, Vieira's discourse has its development divided into two parts: praise for the fishes' virtues and reprehension for their vices.

=== The good fish ===
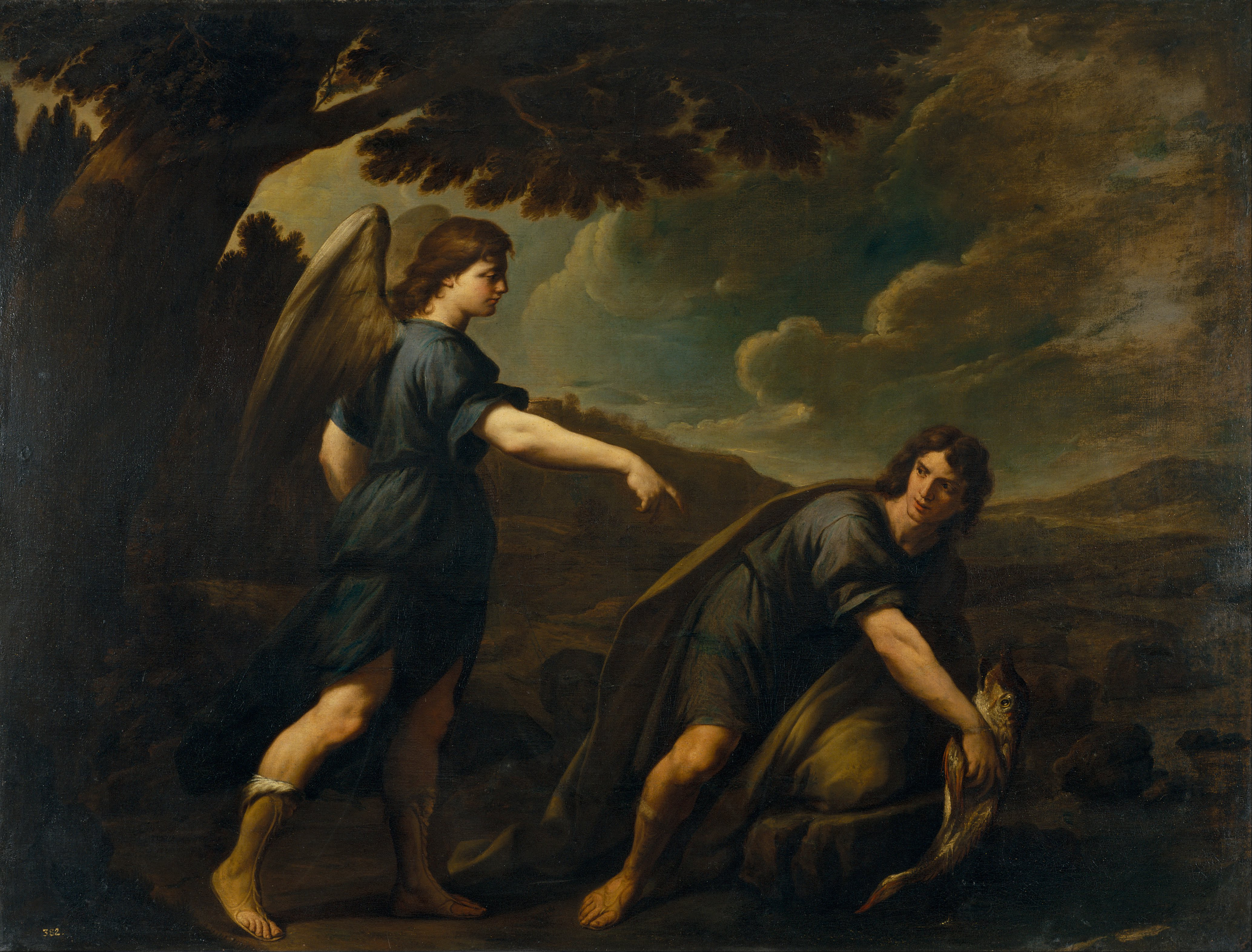
Tobias and the Fish, c. 1640, by Andrea Vaccaro (National Art Museum of Catalonia)

Praising the fish, Vieira compliments their ability to listen and not speak; their inability to convert matters not to the preacher since "this is such an ordinary pain that custom makes it almost imperceptible". The fact that they cannot be domesticated means they have not been corrupted by men. Vieira goes on to list the virtues of particular fish:

- The Holy Fish of Tobias — represents preachers and their inner virtue; from the Biblical account in the Book of Tobit, the fish came to Tobias as an apparent threat but the Archangel Raphael instructed him to use the fish's gall to cure his father's blindness and his heart to cast away the demon Asmodeus
- The remora — a small fish that latches on to ships, holding them back; it is compared to the strength of the good preacher's words, arresting human passions and changing the course of sinners' lives
- The torpedo — an electric ray that is capable of emitting a shock into the body of a prey animal to stun it; it represents conversion
- The four-eyes — a fish with eyes above the top of the head and divided in two different parts, so that they can see below and above the surface; it represents the virtue of prudence, having sights set onto Heaven above but always mindful of Hell below

=== The bad fish ===
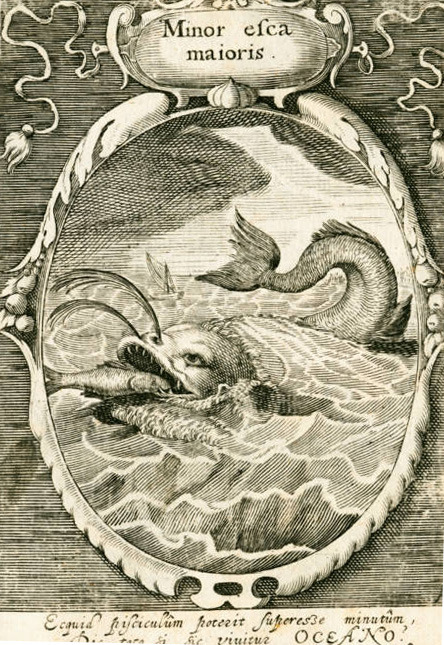
Minor esca maioris ("The smaller is the prey of the larger"), 1617, by Peter Isselburg (Emblemata Politica In Aula Magna Curiae Noribergensis Depicta)

The greatest thing Vieira finds reprehensible about fish is that they eat one another ("So foreign a thing it is, not only to reason but to nature itself, that you live by eating one another, all of you being created in the same element, all of you citizens of the same homeland, and all of you, finally, brothers"), noting on how big fish eating small fish is particularly perverse because the big ones cannot satisfy their hunger by eating the little ones one by one. He also remarks on how easily fish are tempted by just any old piece of cloth passing for bait dangling on a hook (Vieira here makes reference to the habits of the Portuguese orders of chivalry, overtly attacking the social elites). He then chastises specific fish on their particular vices:

- The grunt — a small fish that produces sound by grinding its teeth; it symbolises pride and arrogance (and is compared to other Biblical grunts like Saint Peter at the Last Supper, Goliath before the young David, Caiaphas and Pilate during the Passion)
- The suckerfish — fish that use their suckers to cling to larger marine animals like sharks; they invariably meet their demise when the big fish fall, representing freeloaders and opportunists
- The flying fish — which have modified wing-like fins that enable them to glide above the surface when leaping out of water; they evade the fisherman's hook only to accidentally land aboard his boat, representing vanity and the sin of ambition ("you are not birds, but fish, and not even among the best fish")
- The octopus — resembles a monk with its mantle and seems gentle due to its flexible appendages, but shoots ink as a smoke screen before he attacks his prey; represents treachery and is called worse than Judas Iscariot ("Judas embraced Christ, but others arrested Him; the Octopus is the one who embraces and moreover arrests")
