= Edgar Prestage =

British historian & Portuguese scholar (1869-1951)

Edgar Prestage GOSE
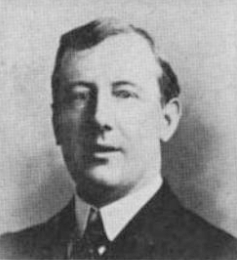
- Born: 20 July 1869; Manchester, England
- Died: 10 March 1951 (aged 82); London, England
- Occupation: Academic

Edgar Prestage GOSE (1869–1951) was a British historian and Portuguese scholar.

== Biography ==
Born in Manchester on 20 July 1869, he served as professor of Portuguese at King's College, London between 1923 and 1936, and had authored over a hundred publications. He died in London on 3 March 1951. In his obituary, he was described as "Britain's leading authority of his era on Portuguese literature and history".

== Honours ==
- Grand Officer of the Order of Saint James of the Sword, Portugal (2 September 1930)
