= Francisco de Sá de Miranda =

Portuguese poet (1481–1558)

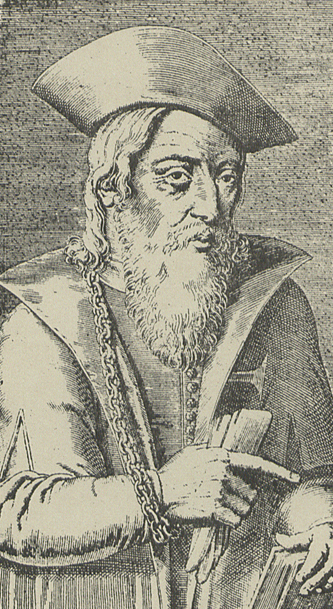
- Born: 28 August 1481; Coimbra, Kingdom of Portugal
- Died: 17 May 1558 (aged 76); Amares, Kingdom of Portugal
- Occupation: Poet

Francisco de Sá de Miranda (28 August 1481 – 17 May 1558; Portuguese pronunciation: [fɾɐ̃ˈsiʃku ðɨ ˈsa ðɨ miˈɾɐ̃dɐ]) was a Portuguese poet of the Renaissance.

== Life ==
Sá de Miranda was born in Coimbra, the son of a canon Gonçalo Mendes de Sá belonging to the ancient and noble family of Sá and Inês de Melo. His brother, Mem de Sá, was the third governor of the Portuguese colony of Brazil.

Sá de Miranda passed his early years by the banks of the river Mondego, considered a source of inspiration to many other poets. He made his first studies of Greek, Latin and philosophy in the college of the Santa Cruz Monastery, and in 1505 went to University of Lisbon (the University of Coimbra had moved to Lisbon in 1380) to study law, beginning at the same time to attend the Portuguese court and write poems in the mediaeval style still dominant in Portugal.

Verse-making and gallantry occupied much of his time at court, and he became one of a group comprising the greatest nobles and most celebrated poets of the age, including Bernardim Ribeiro and Cristóvão Falcão, who surrounded the courtier Leonor de Mascareñas. He seems to have resided for the most part in the capital up to 1521, dividing his time between the palace and the university, where he had taken the degree of Doctor of Law by 1516. He accompanied the court as it moved from place to place during the reign of King Manuel, and although he witnessed military triumphs, he started pointing out the signs of decadence and future disaster. He had come out of the university so good a lawyer that he was able to act as ad interim professor of his faculty, and he was offered a judicial post, but refused it. He had only embarked on a legal career to please his father, and on the latter's death he abandoned law for moral and stoic philosophy and poetry. He had observed with regret the modest intellectual position of his country, and resolved to travel.

Sá de Miranda travelled to Italy in 1521, where he was able to make contact with many writers and artists of the Renaissance, including Vittoria Colonna (who was his distant relative), Pietro Bembo, Sannazzaro and Ariosto. He assisted at the rebirth of Italian drama and saw the performance of classical prose comedies, a form of art which he was to transplant to Portugal. On his way home, in 1526, he visited Spain, meeting classical writers Juan Boscan and Garcilaso de la Vega.

Back in Portugal in 1526 or 1527, he was again received at court, where he became a friend to King John III and other nobles. But although his reputation as a courtier and poet grew, the opposition of his literary foes increased. He also became pessimistic at the materialism of the age and neglect of agriculture. Four years after his return he decided to move to the Minho province, in the North of the country, where he purchased land. Around 1530 he married Briolanja de Azevedo, a lady of noble birth.

In 1552 he moved to the Quinta da Tapada, near Amares. He continued to write and receive work from other poets, showing that his influence was well established. Three misfortunes followed in quick succession: his eldest son died in 1553, Prince John in 1554, and his wife in 1555. His friend John III died in 1557, and Sá de Miranda followed him in 1558, aged 76.

== Work ==
Like many Portuguese writers of his time, Sá de Miranda often wrote in Castilian apart from Portuguese. His early work is all in the form of the typical 15th-century Portuguese poetry (the vilancete, the cantiga, the esparsa and the trova). Influenced by his travels in Italy and Spain, Sá de Miranda introduced a new aesthetics in Portugal. He introduced the sonnet, the elegy, the eclogue, the ottava rima and other classical poetic forms, adapting the Portuguese language to the Italian hendecasyllable verse. These forms, especially sonnet and ottava rima were later used by many Portuguese poets including Luís Vaz de Camões.

Apart from poems, Sá de Miranda wrote two theatrical comedies following classical forms: Estrangeiros, the first Portugues prose comedy (staged to great success in Coimbra in 1528 and published in 1559) and Vilhalpandos (written around 1530 and published in 1560). His tragedy Cleópatra has only survived in fragments.

Sá de Miranda also left several letters in verse, addressed to people like King John III and his brother Mem de Sá.

== Bibliography ==
- Lusitania illustrata. Notices on the history, antiquities, literature &c, by John Adamson, Newcastle on Tyne 1842.
- Dreams of Waking: An Anthology of Iberian Lyric Poetry 1400-1700. Edited and Translated by Vincent Barletta, Mark L. Bajus, Cici Malik, The University of Chicago Press, Chicago 2013.
