= Bernardim Ribeiro =

Portuguese poet and writer

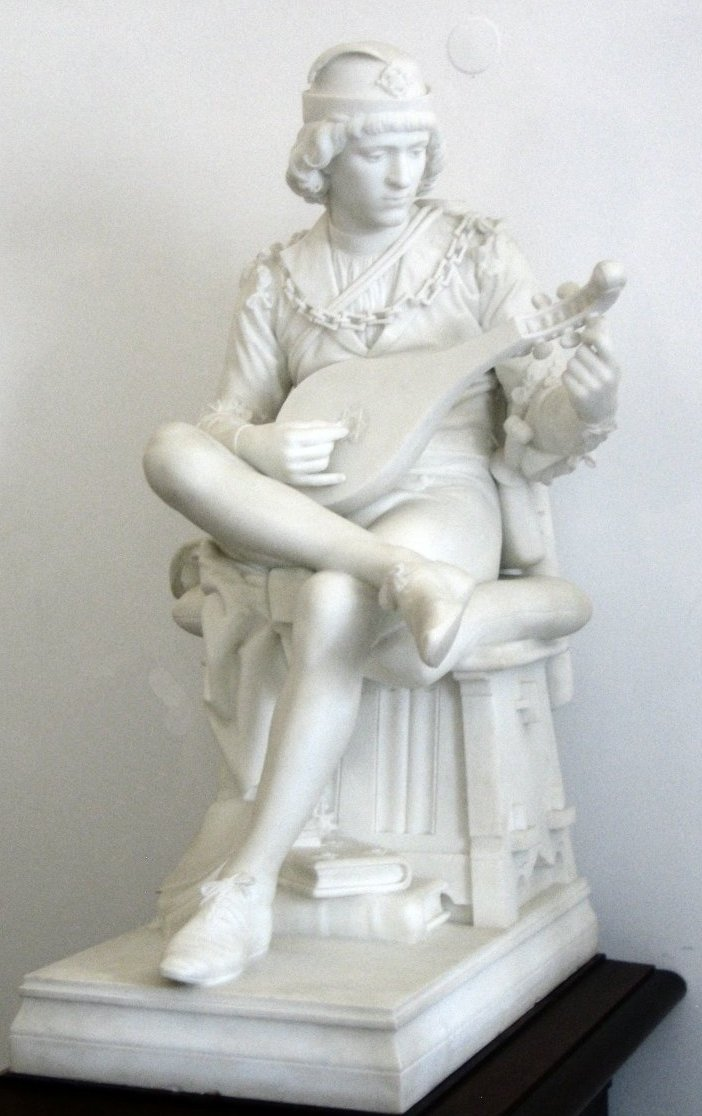
- Bernardim Ribeiro, marble sculpture by António Alberto Nunes.
- Born: 1482; Torrão, Portugal
- Died: October 1552 (aged 69–70); Lisbon, Portugal
- Occupations: Poet and writer

Bernardim Ribeiro (1482 – October 1552) was a Renaissance Portuguese poet and writer.

== Early life ==
Ribeiro was a native of Torrão in the Alentejo. His father, Damião Ribeiro, was implicated in a conspiracy against King John II in 1484, and had to flee to Castile, while young Bernardim and his mother took refuge with their relatives António and Inês Zagalo at Quinta dos Lobos, near Sintra.

When Manuel I came to the Portuguese throne in 1495, he rehabilitated the families persecuted by his predecessor, and Ribeiro was able to leave his retreat and return to Torrão. Meanwhile, Dona Inês had married a rich landowner of Estremoz, and in 1503 she was summoned to court and appointed one of the attendants to the Infanta Beatriz. Ribeiro accompanied her, and through her influence the king took him under his protection and sent him to the University of Lisbon, where he studied from 1506 to 1512. When he obtained his degree in law, the king showed him further favour by appointing him to the post of Escrivão da Câmara, or secretary, and later by bestowing on him the habit of the Military Order of Saint James of the Sword.

== Scandal and exile ==
Ribeiro's poetic career began with his coming to court, and his early verses are to be found in the Cancioneiro Geral of Garcia de Resende. He took part in the historic Serões do Paço, or palace evening entertainments, which largely consisted of poetical improvisations. There he met, and earned the friendship of the poets Sá de Miranda and Cristóvão Falcão, who became his literary comrades and the confidantes of his romance, in which hope deferred and bitter disappointment ended in tragedy.

Ribeiro had early conceived a violent passion for his cousin, Dona Joana Zagalo, the daughter of his protector, Dona Inês. However, her family opposed her marriage to a singer and dreamer with small means and prospects, and finally compelled her to wed a rich man, one Pero Gato. When the latter died shortly afterwards, Joanna retired to a house in the country, where it was rumoured that Ribeiro was a visitor, and in 1521 she went into seclusion in the convent of St Clare at Estremoz, where she died some years later. It was alleged that Ribeiro's conduct had caused a scandal which led the king to deprive him of his office and exile him.

Ribeiro poured out his heart in five eclogues, the earliest in Portuguese, written in the popular octosyllabic verse; and now, hopeless of the future and broken in spirit, he decided to go to Italy, for a poet the land of promise. He started early in 1522, travelling widely in the peninsula, and during his stay he wrote his moving knightly and pastoral romance Livro das saudades, mostly known as Menina e moça (taken from its incipit), in which he related the story of his unfortunate passion, personifying himself under the anagram of "Bimnarder," and Dona Inês under that of "Aonia." The title can be translated as Maiden and Modest, and is regarded as one of the finest examples of the genre of pastoral romance in Renaissance literature.

== Return and decline ==
When he returned home in 1524, the new king, John III, restored him to his former post, and it is said that he paid a last visit to his love at St Clare's convent and found her in a fit of madness. From that time his mental powers declined. About 1534 he suffered a long illness, and he continued to decline until his death. He was unable to fulfil the duties of his office, and in 1549 the king bestowed upon him a pension for his support. He did not live long to enjoy it, as in 1552 he died at All Saints Hospital in Lisbon.

The Menina e Moça was not printed until after Ribeiro's death, and then first in Ferrara in 1554. On its appearance the book made such a sensation that its reading was forbidden, because it disclosed a family tragedy which the allegory could not hide. It is divided into two parts, the first of which is certainly the work of Ribeiro. However, opinion has been divided on the second. One edition of the first part was made by Dr José Pessanha (Oporto, 1891), and a more current edition was made in 2012 (see bibliography). Ribeiro's verses, including his five eclogues, were reprinted in a limited edition by Dr Xavier da Cunha (Lisbon, 1886).

== Bibliography ==
- Ribeiro, Bernardim (2012). Maiden and Modest: A Renaissance Pastoral Romance. Trans. by Gregory Rabassa (1st ed.). Dartmouth, Massachusetts: Tagus Press at UMass Dartmouth. ISBN 978-1-933227-37-5.
