= Natália Correia =

Portuguese writer and social activist (1923–1993)

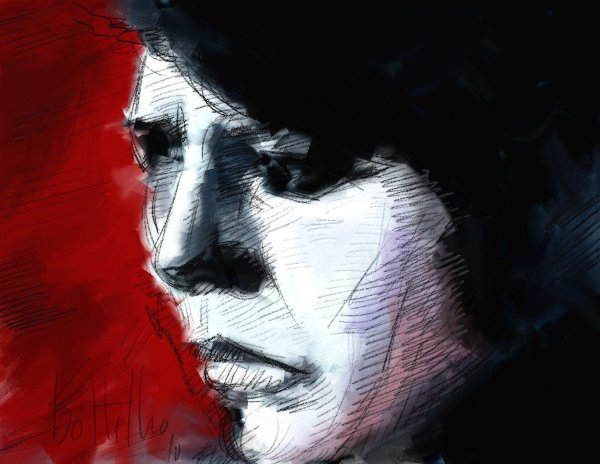
Natália Correia by Bottelho.

Natália de Oliveira Correia, GOSE, GOL (13 September 1923 – 16 March 1993) was a Portuguese intellectual, poet and social activist, as well as the author of the official lyrics of the "Hino dos Açores", the regional anthem of the Autonomous Region of the Azores. Her work spanned various genres of Portuguese media and she collaborated with many Portuguese and international figures. A member of the Portuguese National Assembly (1980–1991), she regularly intervened politically on behalf of the arts and culture, in the defense of human rights and women's rights.

Along with José Saramago, Armindo Magalhães, Manuel da Fonseca and Urbano Tavares Rodrigues, she helped create the FNDC, Frente Nacional para a Defesa da Cultura (the National Front for the Defense of Culture). She was a central figure in the artistic scene, who met with people central to Portuguese culture and literature in the 1950s and 1960s. Her works have been translated into various languages.

== Biography ==
Natália Correia was born in Fajã de Baixo (Ponta Delgada), São Miguel, Azores. She was the daughter of Maria José de Oliveira, a primary school teacher born in Capelas who had some minor success with writing romances, and Manuel de Medeiros Correia, who married in 1918. At the age of eleven, Natália and her older sister, Carmen de Oliveira Correia, and mother moved to Lisbon, while their father emigrated to Brazil. She began her studies in Lisbon, and quickly found her interest in literature, inititally publishing her first work, for children: A Grande Aventura de Um Pequeno Herói and specific poetry.

She continued her career in drama, romance, translation, journalism, and editing, becoming familiar with the media in all its forms, as well as television. It was during her work on the program Mátria that she advocated her own special form of feminism, which flowed counter to the politically correct format of the movement. She called it matricismo, where she showed the woman as an archetype of liberal eroticism: passionate and feminine; later her literary notions of patria (the nation or fatherland) and mátria (the woman) would be extended to fratria (fraternity).

Correia's deep affection for her native island's natural beauty is demonstrated profoundly in the themes, images and symbols portrayed in her works, as well as by her affinity with fellow countrymen authors Antero de Quental and contemporary Vitorino Nemésio. She was much influenced by surrealism, Galician-Portuguese poetry, and mysticism, and her works span the spectrum from poetic romanticism to satire. She worked in many different genres: poetry, essays, theater, and anthologies.

With a talent for oratory and a combative nature, she became active in the opposition movement to the Estado Novo regime of António Oliveira Salazar, participating in the Movimento de Unidade Democrática (Movement for Democratic Unity) in 1945, and supporting the Presidential candidacies of Generals Norton de Matos (1949) and Humberto Delgado (1958), as well as joining the Comissão Eleitoral de Unidade Democrática (Electoral Commission of the Democratic Unity) in 1969. For her activism she was condemned to three years in prison, with a suspended sentence, for the publication of her work Antologia da Poesia Portuguesa Erótica e Satírica (Anthology of Portuguese Erotic Poetry and Satire), considered offensive by the authorities in 1966. She was also tried for editorial responsibility for Novas Cartas Portuguesas (New Portuguese Letters) written by Maria Isabel Barreno, Maria Velho da Costa and Maria Teresa Horta.

Natália was responsible for coordinating the publications of Editora Arcádia, one of the important Portuguese editorials of the time. In 1971, with colleagues Isabel Meireles, Júlia Marenha and Helena Roseta, she started the bar Botequim, where during the decade between 1970 and 1980 she met with a great part of the Portuguese intellectual community.

== Political life ==
In 1980, she was elected to Parliament as a member of the PPD (Partido Popular Democrático).

She was a friend of António Sérgio, associated with Movimento da Filosofia Portuguesa (Movement of Portuguese Philosophy), David Mourão-Ferreira, José-Augusto França, Luiz Pacheco, Almada Negreiros, Mário Cesariny, Ary dos Santos, Amália Rodrigues, and Fernando Dacosta. An enthusiast of the café-concert scene in Portugal, she supported her friend the cross-dresser Guida Scarllaty (the actor Carlos Ferreira). Her home was also a stage for famous writers such as Henry Miller, Graham Greene and Ionesco.

In 1991, Correia received the Grand Prize in Poetry from the Associação Portuguesa de Escritores (Association of Portuguese Writers), for her book Sonetos Românticos (Romantic Sonnets). In the same year, she was conferred the Ordem da Liberdade (Order of Liberty); she was already the holder of the Ordem de Santiago (Order of St. James).

== Personal life ==
She was married four times: in 1942, to Álvaro Pereira; in 1949, to William Creighton Hyler; in 1950, to Alfredo Machado and finally in March 1990, to Dórdio Leal Guimarães. It was Alfredo Luiz Machado (1904–1989), her "great passion", much older and a widower that marked her personal life. Her 1990 marriage to Dórdio Guimarães, at 67 years of age, was much more a marriage of convenience with a collaborator and friend.

== Death ==
Correia died in the early morning of 16 March 1993 in Lisbon, of a heart-attack, after returning from the Bar Botequim. In her will, the Azorean bequeathed many of her possessions to the Autonomous Region of the Azores; a permanent exposition in the Public Library and Regional Archive in Ponta Delgada celebrates her literary history. The institution holds many of her literary works (which it shares with the National Library of Lisbon), including many unedited volumes, biographical documents, iconography and correspondence, as well as many works of art her private library.

== Literature ==
- Grandes Aventuras de um Pequeno Herói = Great Adventures of A Little Hero (infantile romance), 1945
- Anoiteceu no Bairro (romance), 1946; 2004
- Rio de Nuvens (poem), 1947
- Descobri Que Era Europeia: impressões duma viagem à América, 1951; 2002
- Sucubina ou a Teoria do Chapéu (theatrical), with Manuel de Lima, 1952
- Poemas = Poems (poem), 1955
- Dimensão Encontrada (poem), 1957
- O Progresso de Édipo (dramatic poem), 1957
- Passaporte = Passport (poem), 1958
- Poesia de Arte e Realismo Poético (Art Poems and Poetic Realisms) (essay), 1959
- Comunicação = Communication (dramatic poem), 1959
- Cântico do País Emerso (poem), 1961
- A Questão Académica de 1907 (An Academic Question of 1907) (essay), 1962
- Antologia de Poesia Portuguesa Erótica e Satírica: dos cancioneiros medievais à actualidade (anthology), 1965; 2000
- O Homúnculo, tragédia jocosa (theatrical), 1965
- Mátria (poem), 1967 a
- A Madona (romance), 1968; 2000
- O Encoberto (theatrical), 1969; 1977
- O Vinho e a Lira (poem), 1969
- Cantares dos Trovadores Galego-Portugueses (anthology), 1970; 1998
- As Maçãs de Orestes (poem), 1970
- Trovas de D. Dinis, [Trobas d'el Rey D. Denis] (poem), 1970
- A Mosca Iluminada (poem), 1972
- O Surrealismo na Poesia Portuguesa (The Surrealism in Portuguese Poetry) (anthology), 1973; 2002
- A Mulher, antologia poética (anthology), 1973
- O Anjo do Ocidente à Entrada do Ferro (poem), 197llc3
- Uma Estátua para Herodes (Ensaio), 1974
- Poemas a Rebate, (poem), 1975
- Epístola aos Iamitas (poem), 1976
- Não Percas a Rosa. Diário e algo mais (25 de Abril de 1974 - 20 de Dezembro de 1975) (diary), 1978; 2003
- O Dilúvio e a Pomba (poem), 1979
- Erros Meus, Má Fortuna, Amor Ardente (theatrical), 1981; 1991
- Antologia de Poesia do Período Barroco (Poetic Anthology of the Baroque Period) (anthology), 1982
- Notas para uma Introdução às Cantigas de Escárnio e de Mal-Dizer Galego-Portuguesas (essay), 1982
- A Ilha de Sam Nunca: atlantismo e insularidade na poesia de António de Sousa (anthology), 1982
- A Ilha de Circe (Circe's Island) (romance), 1983; 2001
- A Pécora, play written in 1967 (theatrical), 1983; 1990
- O Armistício (poem) = The Armistice, 1985 a
- Onde está o Menino Jesus?, 1987
- Somos Todos Hispanos (essay), 1988; 2003
- Sonetos Românticos (Romantic Sonnets) (poem), 1990; 1991
- As Núpcias (Romance), 1992
- O Sol nas Noites e o Luar nos Dias (The Sun in the Nights And The Moon During The Days) (complete poem), 1993; 2000
- Memória da Sombra, versos para esculturas de António Matos (poem), 1993l
- D. João e Julieta, peça escrita em 1959 (theatrical), 1999
- A Ibericidade na Dramaturgia Portuguesa (essay), 2000
- Breve História da Mulher e outros escritos (anthology), 2003
- A Estrela de Cada Um (anthology), 2004
