= Women's liberation movement =

Branch of radical feminist thought

- Part of second-wave feminism
- Date: 1960s – 1980s
- Location: Worldwide
- Caused by: Institutional sexism
- Goals: Equality for women; General human rights for all people
- Methods: Consciousness raising; Protest; Reform
- Result: Awareness of women's issues; Political reforms

Casualties and losses
none	

The women's liberation movement (WLM), or women's lib for short, was a diverse sub-movement within second-wave feminism, broadly falling under radical and sometimes liberal feminism, which proposed that the furthering of economic, psychological, and social freedoms was necessary for women to progress from being second-class citizens in their societies. It emerged in the late 1960s and continued till the 1980s, primarily in the industrialized nations of the Western world, which resulted in great change (political, intellectual, and cultural) throughout the world. The WLM branch of radical feminism, based in contemporary philosophy, increasingly comprised women of racially and culturally diverse backgrounds, criticizing the more mainstream, white, middle-class focus of the rest of the movement.

Towards achieving the equality of women, the WLM questioned the cultural and legal validity of patriarchy and the practical validity of the social and sexual hierarchies used to control and limit the legal and physical independence of women in society. Women's liberationists proposed that sexism—legalized formal and informal sex-based discrimination predicated on the existence of the social construction of gender—was the principal political problem with the power dynamics of their societies.

In general, the WLM proposed socio-economic change from the political left, rejected the idea that piecemeal equality, within and according to social class, would eliminate sexual discrimination against women, and fostered the tenets of humanism, especially the respect for human rights of all people. In the decades during which the women's liberation movement flourished, liberationists successfully changed how women were perceived in their cultures, redefined the socio-economic and the political roles of women in society, and transformed mainstream society.

== Background ==
The wave theory of social development holds that intense periods of social activity are followed by periods of remission, in which the activists involved intensely in mobilization are systematically marginalized and isolated. After the intense period fighting for women's suffrage, the common interest which had united international feminists left the women's movement without a single focus upon which all could agree. Ideological differences between radicals and moderates, led to a split and a period of deradicalization, with the largest group of women's activists spearheading movements to educate women on their new responsibilities as voters. Organizations such as the African National Congress Women's League, the Irish Housewives Association, the League of Women Voters, the Townswomen's Guilds and the Women's Institutes supported women and tried to educate them on how to use their new rights to incorporate themselves into the established political system.

Other organizations, involved in the mass movement of women into the workforce during World War I and World War II and their subsequent exit at the end of the war with concerted official efforts to return to family life, turned their efforts to labor issues. The World YWCA and Zonta International, were leaders in these efforts, mobilizing women to gather information on the situation of working women and organize assistance programs. Increasingly, radical organizations, like the American National Woman's Party, were marginalized by media which denounced feminism and its proponents as "severe neurotics responsible for the problems of" society. Those who were still attached to the radical themes of equality were typically unmarried, employed, socially and economically advantaged and seemed to the larger society to be deviant.

In countries throughout Africa, Asia, the Caribbean, the Middle East and South America, efforts to decolonize and replace authoritarian regimes, which largely began in the 1950s and stretched through the 1980s, initially saw the state overtaking the role of radical feminists. For example, in Egypt, the 1956 Constitution eliminated gender barriers to labor, political access, and education through provisions for gender equality. Women in Argentina, Brazil, Chile, Cuba, Nicaragua and other Latin American countries had worked for an end to dictatorships in their countries. As those governments turned to socialist policies, the state aimed to eliminate gender inequality through state action. As ideology in Asia, Africa and the Caribbean shifted left, women in newly independent and still colonized countries saw a common goal in opposing imperialism. They focused their efforts to address gendered power imbalances in their quest for respect of human rights and nationalist goals. This worldwide movement towards decolonization and the realignment of international politics into Cold War camps after the end of World War II, usurped the drive for women's enfranchisement, as universal suffrage and nationhood became the goal for activists. A Pan-African awareness and global recognition of blackness as a unifying point for struggle, led to a recognition by numerous marginalized groups that there was potential to politicize their oppression.

In their attempt to influence these newly independent countries to align with the United States, in the polarized Cold War climate, racism in U.S. policy became a stumbling block to the foreign policy objective to become the dominant superpower. Black leaders were aware of the favorable climate for securing change and pushed forward the Civil Rights Movement to address racial inequalities. They sought to eliminate the damage of oppression, using liberation theory and a movement which sought to create societal transformation in the way people thought about others by infusing the disenfranchised with political power to change the power structures. The Black Power movement and global student movements protested the apparent double standards of the age and the authoritarian nature of social institutions. From Czechoslovakia to Mexico, in diverse locations like Germany, France, Italy, and Japan, among others, students protested the civil, economic and political inequalities, as well as involvement in the Vietnam War. Many of the activists participating in these causes would go on to participate in the feminist movement.

Socially, the baby boom experienced after the Second World War, the relative worldwide economic growth in the post-war years, the expansion of the television industry sparking improved communications, as well as access to higher education for both women and men led to an awareness of the social problems women faced and the need for a cultural change. At the time, women were economically dependent on men and neither the concept of patriarchy nor a coherent theory about the power relationships between men and women in society existed. If they worked, positions available to women were typically in light manufacturing or agricultural work and a limited segment of positions in the service industries, such as bookkeeping, domestic labor, nursing, secretarial and clerical work, retail sales, or school teaching. They were expected to work for lower wages than men and upon marriage, terminate their employment. Women were unable to obtain bank accounts or credit, making renting housing impossible, without a man's consent. In many countries they were not allowed to go into public spaces without a male chaperone.

Married women from Commonwealth countries and thus with a common law legal code were legally bound to have sex with their husbands upon demand. At the time, marital rape was not a concept in common law, as it was legally considered that women had given consent to regular intercourse upon marrying. The state and church placed enormous pressure on young women to retain their virginity. Introduction of the birth control pill gave many men a sense that as women could not get pregnant, they could not say no to intercourse. Though by the 1960s the pill was widely available, prescription was tightly controlled and in many countries, dissemination of information about birth control was illegal. Even after the pill was legalized, contraception remained banned in numerous countries, like Ireland where condoms were banned and the pill could only be prescribed to control menstrual cycles. The Catholic Church issued the encyclical Humanae vitae in 1968, reiterating the ban on artificial contraception. Abortion often required the consent of a spouse, or approval by a board, as in Canada, wherein the decisions often revolved around whether pregnancy posed a threat to the woman's health or life.

As women became more educated and joined the workforce, their home responsibilities remained largely unchanged. Though families increasingly depended on dual incomes, women carried most of the responsibility for domestic work and care of children. There had long been recognized by society in general of the inequalities in civil, socio-economic, and political agency between women and men. However, the women's liberation movement was the first time that the idea of challenging sexism gained wide acceptance. Literature on sex, such as the Kinsey Reports, and the development and distribution of the birth control pill, created a climate wherein women began to question the authority others wielded over their decisions regarding their bodies and their morality. Many of the women who participated in the movement, were aligned with leftist politics and after 1960, with the development of Cold War polarization, took their inspiration from Maoist theory. Slogans such as "workers of the world unite" turned into "women of the world unite" and key features like consciousness-raising and egalitarian consensus-based policies "were inspired by similar techniques used in China".

Into this backdrop of world events, Simone de Beauvoir published The Second Sex in 1949, which was translated into English in 1952. In the book, de Beauvoir put forward the idea that equality did not require women be masculine to become empowered. With her famous statement, "One is not born, but rather becomes, a woman", she laid the groundwork for the concept of gender as a social construct, as opposed to a biological trait. The same year, Margaret Mead published Male and Female, which though it analyzed primitive societies of New Guinea, showed that gendered activities varied between cultures and that biology had no role in defining which tasks were performed by men or women. By 1965, de Beauvoir and Mead's works had been translated into Danish and became widely influential with feminists. Kurahashi Yumiko published her debut Partei in 1960, which critically examined the student movement. The work started a trend in Japan of feminist works which challenged the opportunities available to women and mocked conventional power dynamics in Japanese society. In 1963, Betty Friedan published The Feminine Mystique, voicing the discontent felt by American women.

== Aims ==
As the women's suffrage movement emerged from the abolition movement, the women's liberation movement grew out of the struggle for civil rights. Though challenging patriarchy and the anti-patriarchal message of the women's liberation movement was considered radical, it was not the only, nor the first, radical movement in the early period of second-wave feminism. Rather than simply desiring legal equality, those participating in the movement believed that the moral and social climate which perceived women as second-class citizens needed to change. Though most groups operated independently—there were no national umbrella organizations—there were unifying philosophies of women participating in the movement. Challenging patriarchy and the hierarchical organization of society which defined women as subordinate in both public and private spheres, liberationists believed that women should be free to define their own individual identity as part of human society.

One of the reasons that women who supported the movement chose not to create a single approach to addressing the problem of women being treated as second-class citizens was that they did not want to foster an idea that anyone was an expert or that any one group or idea could address all of the societal problems women faced. They also wanted women, whose voices had been silenced to be able to express their own views on solutions. Rejecting authority and espousing participatory democracy as well as direct action, they promoted a wide agenda including civil rights, eliminating objectification of women, ethnic empowerment, granting women reproductive rights, increasing opportunities for women in the workplace, peace, and redefining familial roles, as well as gay and lesbian liberation. A dilemma faced by movement members was how they could challenge the definition of femininity without compromising the principles of feminism.

Women's historical participation in the world was virtually unknown, even to trained historians. Women's roles in historic events were not covered in academic texts and not taught in schools. Even the fact that women had been denied the vote was something few university students were aware of in the era. Liberationists in the women in print movement sought to reclaim the movement's foremothers by reprinting the writings of historical women including Radclyffe Hall, Natalie Clifford Barney, Gertrude Stein, Alice B. Toklas, and Colette. These reprints influenced the literary canon by drawing renewed attention to women's writings. The women in print movement also sought to establish autonomous communications networks of feminist publications, presses, and bookstores created by and for women. Feminists used these publications for consciousness raising, education, self-expression, and movement coordination.

To understand the wider implications of women's experiences, WLM groups launched women's studies programs introducing feminist history, sociology and psychology to higher education and adult education curricula to counter gender biases in teaching these subjects. Writing women back into history became extremely important in the period with attention to the differences of experiences based on class, ethnic background, race and sexual orientation. The courses became widespread by the end of the decade in Britain, Canada, and the United States, and were also introduced in such places as Italy and Norway.

Thousands of adherents joined the movement which began in the United States and spread to Canada and Mexico. In Europe, movements developed in Austria, Belgium, Denmark, England, France, Germany, Greece, Iceland, Ireland, Italy, The Netherlands, Northern Ireland, Norway, Portugal, Scotland, Spain, Sweden, Switzerland and Wales. The liberationist movement also was active in Australia, Fiji, Guam, India, Israel, Japan, New Zealand, Singapore, South Korea, and Taiwan.

Key components of the movement were consciousness-raising sessions aimed at politicizing personal issues, small group and limited organizational structure and a focus on changing societal perception rather than reforming legislation. For example, liberationists did not support reforming family codes to allow abortion, instead, they believed that neither medical professionals nor the state should have the power to limit women's complete control of their own bodies. They favored abolishing laws which limited women's rights over their reproduction, believing such control was an individual right, not subject to moralistic majority views. Most liberationists banned the participation of men in their organizations. Though often depicted in media as a sign of "man-hating", the separation was a focused attempt to eliminate defining women via their relationship to men. Since women's inequality within their employment, family and society were commonly experienced by all women, separation meant unity of purpose to evaluate their second-class status.

== Development ==
=== North America ===
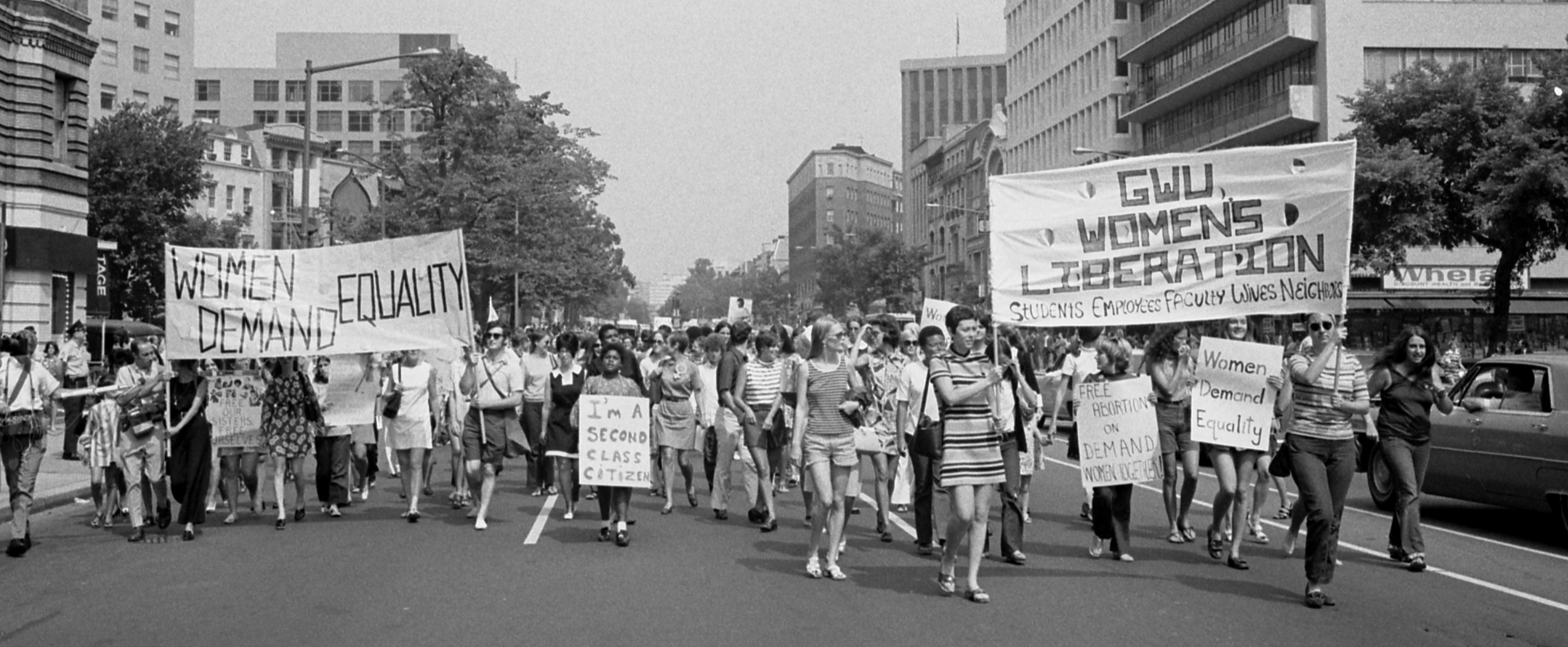
The women's liberation movement featured political activities such as a march demanding legal equality for women in the United States (26 August 1970).

In Canada and the United States, the movement developed out of the Civil Rights Movement, Anti-War sentiment toward the Vietnam War, the Native Rights Movement and the New Left student movement of the 1960s. Between 1965 and 1966, papers presented at meetings of the Students for a Democratic Society and articles published in journals, such as the Canadian Random began advocating for women to embark on a path of self-discovery free from male scrutiny. In 1967, the first Women's Liberation organizations formed in major cities like Berkeley, Boston, Chicago, New York City and Toronto. Quickly organizations spread across both countries. In Mexico, the first group of liberationists formed in 1970, inspired by the student movement and US women's liberationists.

Organizations were loosely organized, without a hierarchical power structure and favored all-women participation to eliminate defining women or their autonomy by their association with men. Groups featured consciousness-raising discussions on a wide variety of issues, the importance of having freedom to make choices, and the importance of changing societal attitudes and perceptions of women's roles. Canadian women's lib groups typically incorporated a class-based component into their theory of oppression which was mostly missing from US liberation theory, which focused almost exclusively on sexism and a belief that women's oppression stemmed from their gender and not as a result of their economic or social class. In Quebec, women's and Quebec's autonomy were entwined issues with women struggling for the right to serve as jurors.

Advocating public self-expression by participating in protests and sit-ins, liberationists demonstrated against discriminatory hiring and wage practices in Canada, while in the US liberationists protested the Miss America Beauty Pageant for objectifying women. In both countries women's liberation groups were involved protesting their legislators for abortion rights for women. In Mexico liberationists protested at the Monument to the Mother on Mother's Day to challenge the idea that all women were destined to be mothers. Challenging gender definitions and the sexual relationship to power drew lesbians into the movement in both the United States and Canada. Because liberationists believed that sisterhood was a uniting component to women's oppression, lesbians were not seen as a threat to other women. Another important aspect for North American women was developing spaces for women to meet with other women, offer counseling and referral services, provide access to feminist materials, and establish women's shelters for women who were in abusive relationships. In January 1971, over one hundred women illegally occupied an abandoned city building in New York City for thirteen days, where they established a shelter, food co-operative, medical clinic, and health center. The Fifth Street Women's Building Takeover lasted for thirteen days, until the women were evicted and arrested by city authorities.

Increasingly mainstream media portrayed liberationists as man-haters or deranged outcasts. To gain legitimacy for the recognition of sexual discrimination, the media discourse on women's issues was increasingly shaped by the liberal feminist's reformist aims. As liberationists were marginalized, they increasingly became involved in single focus issues, such as violence against women. By the mid-1970s, the women's liberation movement had been effective in changing the worldwide perception of women, bringing sexism to light and moving reformists far to the left in their policy aims for women, but in the haste to distance themselves from the more radical elements, liberal feminists attempted to erase their success and rebrand the movement as the Women's Movement.

=== Asia ===
By the 1970s, the movement had spread to Asia with women's liberation organizations forming in Japan in 1970. The Yom Kippur War raised awareness of the subordinate status of Israeli women, fostering the growth of the WLM. In India, 1974 was a pivotal year when activists from the Navnirman Movement against corruption and the economic crisis, encouraged women to organize direct actions to challenge traditional leadership. In 1975, liberationist ideas in South Korea were introduced by Lee Hyo-jae a professor at Ewha Woman's University after she had read western texts on the movement which were first translated into Korean in 1973. Similarly, Hsiu-lien Annette Lu, who had completed her graduate courses in the United States, brought liberationist ideas to Taiwan, when she returned and began publishing in the mid-1970s.

In Singapore and other Asian countries, conscious effort was made to distinguish their movement from decadent, "free sex" Western feminist ideals, while simultaneously addressing issues that were experienced worldwide by women. In India, the struggle for women's autonomy was rarely separated from the struggle against the caste system and in Israel, though their movement more closely resembled the WLM in the US and Europe, the oppression of Palestinian women was a focal area. In Japan, the movement focused on freeing women from societal perceptions of limitations because of their sex, rather than on a stand for equality. In South Korea, women workers' concerns merged with liberationist ideas within the broader fight against dictatorship, whereas in Taiwan, theories of respect for women and eliminating double standards were promoted by weaving in Confucianist philosophy.

=== Europe ===
In Europe, the women's liberation movement started in the late 1960s and continued through the 1980s. Inspired by events in North America and triggered by the growing presence of women in the labor market, the movement soon gained momentum in Britain and the Scandinavian countries. Though influenced by leftist politics, liberationists in general were resistant to any political order which ignored women entirely or relegated their issues to the sidelines. Women's liberation groups in Europe were distinguished from other feminist activists by their focus on women's rights to control their own bodies and sexuality, as well as their direct actions aimed at provoking the public and making society aware of the issues faced by women.

There were robust women's liberation movements in Western European countries, including developments in Greece, Portugal and Spain, which in the period were emerging from dictatorships. Many different types of actions were held throughout Europe. To increase public awareness of the problems of equal pay, liberationists in Denmark staged a bus sit-in, where they demanded lower fares than male passengers to demonstrate their wage gap. Swedish members of Grupp 8 heckled politicians at campaign rallies, demanding to know why women were only allowed part-time jobs and thus were ineligible for pensions. To address the objectification of women, Belgian liberationists protested at beauty pageants, Dolle Minas in the Netherlands and Nyfeministene of Norway invaded male-only bars, Irish Women United demonstrated against male-only bathing at Forty Foot promontory and Portuguese women dressed as a bride, a housewife and a sex symbol, marching in Edward VII Park.

Reacting on two killings of women in the streets, on 1 March 1977 women in West Berlin started demonstrating at night – later to be repeated as Walpurgis Night every year on May Day eve. Women in England, Scotland and Wales took up the idea of Reclaim the Night marches to challenge the notion that women's behavior caused the violence perpetrated against them. Spanish liberationists from the Colectivo Feminista Pelvis (Pelvis Feminist Collective), Grup per l'Alliberament de la Dona (Group for Women's Liberation) and Mujeres Independientes (Independent Women) carried funeral wreaths through the streets of Mallorca calling for an end to sexual abuse and a judicial system which allowed men to use alcohol or passion as mitigating factors for sexual violence. In Iceland, women virtually shut down the country; when spurred by liberationists, 90% of them took Women's Day Off and refused to participate in household duties or work, instead of attending a protest rally.

In almost all Western European countries liberationists fought for elimination of barriers to free and unrestricted access to contraception and abortion. In Austria, to advocate for the abolition of section 144 of their criminal code, activists used street theater performance. Prominent French activists declared their criminal actions signing the Manifesto of the 343, admitting to having had abortions, as did German activists who signed the Manifesto of the 374. Irish activists took the train and crossed into Northern Ireland to secure prohibited contraception devices and upon their return flouted authorities bypassing the contraband to the public. In the UK, an uneasy alliance formed between liberationists, the National Abortion Campaign and trade unionists to fight a series of bills designed to restrict abortion rights. In Italy, 50,000 women marched through the streets of Rome demanding their right to control their own bodies, but as was typically the result throughout Europe, compromise reform to existing law was passed by the government, limiting the decision by gestation or requiring preliminary medical authorization.

Throughout the period, publishing was crucial for disseminating the theory and ideas of liberation and other feminist schools of thought. Initially many activists relied on translations of material from the US, but increasingly the focus was on producing country-specific editions, or local journals to allow activists to adapt the movement slogan the "personal is political" to reflect their own experiences. Journals and newspapers founded by liberationists included Belgium's Le Petit livre rouge des femmes (The Little Red Book of Women), France's Le torchon brûle (Waging the Battle), Greece's Gia tin Apeleftherosi ton Gynaikon (For the Liberation of Women), Italy's Sottosopra (Upside Down), the Scottish The Tayside Women's Liberation Newsletter or the British Spare Rib, among many others. In the UK, a news service called the Women's Information and Referral Service (WIRES) distributed news of WLM groups throughout the nation.

In West Germany a book distribution run by lesbians snowballed feminist knowledge from 1974 on. Two feminist monthlies - Courage and EMMA - spread the new ideas. The women's camp on Femø organized by the Red Stocking Movement (Denmark) facilitated international exchange too. In 1974 this gathering in the sun gave birth to the first International Tribunal on Crimes against Women held in Brussels 1976.

Books like Die Klosterschule (The Convent School, 1968) by Barbara Frischmuth, which evaluated patriarchy in the parochial schools of Austria, The Female Eunuch (Paladin, 1970) by Germaine Greer and The Descent of Woman (1972) by Welsh author and feminist Elaine Morgan, brought women into the movement who thought that their lives differed from those of women in large urban settings where the movement originated. Other influential publications included the British edition of Our Bodies, Ourselves (1971) edited by Angela Phillips and Jill Rakusen; Frauenhandbuch Nr. 1: Abtreibung und Verhütungsmittel (Women's Guide # 1: Abortion and Contraceptives, 1971) produced in Germany by Helke Sander and Verena Stefan and Skylla sig själv (Self-blame, 1976) by Swede Maria-Pia Boëthius, which evaluated rape culture applied analysis and solutions to local areas. In some cases, books themselves became the focus of liberationists' protests over censorship, as in the case of the Norwegian demonstration at the publishing house Aschehoug, which was forced to publish a translation of the Swedish text Frihet, jämlikhet och systerskap (Freedom, Equality and Sisterhood, 1970), or the international outcry which resulted from the ban and arrest of Portuguese authors Maria Teresa Horta, Maria Isabel Barreno and Maria Velho da Costa over their book Novas Cartas Portuguesas (New Portuguese Letters, 1972).

As the idea of women's freedom gained mainstream approval, governments and more reformist minded women's groups adopted liberationists' ideas and began incorporating them into compromise solutions. By the early 1980s, most activists in the Women's Liberation Movements in Europe moved on to other single focus causes or transitioned into organizations which were political.

=== Oceania ===
The Regatta Hotel protest in 1965, which challenged the ban on serving women drinks in public bars in Queensland, is recognised as a defining moment in the women's liberation movement in Australia. In 1970 the law was changed to allow women to be served drinks in public bars in Queensland.

The first women's liberation organizations in Australia were formed in Sydney in 1969, and by 1970 such organizations had reached Adelaide and Melbourne, as well as Wellington and Auckland. The following year, organizations were formed at the University of the South Pacific in Fiji and in Guam. As in the US and other places where the movement flourished, small consciousness-raising groups with a limited organizational structure were the norm and the focus was on changing societal perception rather than legislation.

Involved in public protests, liberationists demonstrated at beauty pageants to protest women's objectification, and invaded male-only pubs. In Australia they ran petition drives and protests in favor of legalizing abortion and in Auckland led a funeral procession through Albert Park to demonstrate lack of progress on issues which were of concern to women. Liberationists developed multiple publications such as Broadsheet, Liberaction, MeJane, The Circle and Women's Liberation Newsletter to address issues and concerns;. They founded women's shelters and women's centers for meetings and child care services, which were open to all women, be they socialists, lesbians, indigenous women, students, workers or homemakers. The diversity of adherents fractured the movement by the early 1980s, as groups began focusing on specific interests rather than solely on sexism.

== United Kingdom ==
Significant women in the UK women's liberation movement include those active in work for the group from Nottingham: Rose Knight, Jo O'Brien, Antonia (Toni) Gorton, who met at the Women's Centre and produced a journal 'Women Now'. Documentation of the Nottingham Women's Group including these early pioneers has been undertaken and now forms part of the Nottingham Feminist Archive (East Midlands) which is held by Manuscripts and Special Collections at the University of Nottingham..

== Surveillance ==
The FBI kept records on numerous participants in the WLM as well as spying on them and infiltrating their organizations. Roberta Sapler, a participant in the movement between 1968 and 1973 in Pittsburgh, wrote an article regarding her attempts to obtain the FBI file kept on her during the period. The Royal Canadian Mounted Police spied upon liberationists in Canada, as did the Australian Security Intelligence Organisation in their respective country. In Germany, the Federal Office for the Protection of the Constitution (German: Bundesamt für Verfassungsschutz) kept tabs on activists participating in women's center activities. Having lived in a communal housing project or been affiliated with youth movements made liberationists targets and their meeting places were searched and materials were confiscated.

== Legacy ==
The women's liberation movement created a global awareness of patriarchy and sexism. By bringing matters that had long been considered private issues into the public view and linking those issues to deepen understanding about how systemic suppression of women's rights in society are interrelated, liberationists made innovative contributions to feminist theory. Desiring to know about women's historic contributions but often being thwarted in their search due to centuries of censoring and blocking of women's intellectual work, liberationists brought the study of power relationships, including those of sex and diversity, into the social sciences. They launched women's studies programs and publishing houses to ensure that a more culturally comprehensive history of the complex nature of society was developed.

In an effort to distance themselves from the politics and ideas of women in the liberation movement, as well as the personal politics which emerged, many second-wave feminists distanced themselves from the early movement. Meaghan Morris, an Australian scholar of popular culture stated that later feminists could not associate themselves with the ideas and politics of the period and maintain their respect. And yet, liberationists succeeded in pushing the dominant liberal feminists far to the left of their original aims and forced them to include goals that address sexual discrimination. Jean Curthoys argued that in the rush to distance themselves from liberationists, unconscious amnesia rewrote the history of their movement, and failed to grasp the achievement that, without a religious connotation, the movement created an "ethic of the irreducible value of human beings." Phrases that were used in the movement, like "consciousness-raising" and "male chauvinism", became keywords associated with the movement.

=== Influential publications ===
- Barreno, Maria Isabel; Horta, Maria Teresa; Velho da Costa, Maria (1975). The Three Marias: New Portuguese Letters. Translated by Land, Helen R. (1st English ed.). Garden City, New York: Doubleday. p. 4. ISBN 978-0-385-01853-1. Original publication (1972) Novas Cartas Portuguesas (in Portuguese) Lisbon, Portugal Estudios Cor.
- Benston, Margaret (September 1969). "The Political Economy of Women's Liberation" (PDF). Monthly Review. 21 (4): 13. doi:10.14452/MR-021-04-1969-08_2. ISSN 0027-0520. S2CID 144727738.
- Boëthius, Maria-Pia (1976). Skylla sig sjalv: en bok om våldtäkt [Self-blame: A book of rape] (in Swedish). Stockholm, Sweden: Liber Förlag. OCLC 480560113.
- Brownmiller, Susan (1975). Against Our Will: Men, Women and Rape. New York, New York: Simon & Schuster. ISBN 978-0-671-22062-4.
- Ehrenreich, Barbara; English, Deirdre (1973). Witches, Midwives & Nurses: A History of Women Healers. Old Westbury, New York: Feminist Press. ISBN 978-0-912670-13-3.
- Firestone, Shulamith (1972). The Dialectic of Sex (PDF) (revised ed.). New York, New York: Bantam Books. Archived from the original (PDF) on 1 February 2018.
- Firestone, Shulamith; Koedt, Anne, eds. (1968). Notes From the First Year. New York, New York: New York Radical Women. OCLC 28655057.
- Greer, Germaine (1970). The Female Eunuch. London, England: MacGibbon & Kee. ISBN 978-0-261-63208-0.
- Hägg, Maud; Werkmäster, Barbro (1972). Frihet, jämlikhet, systerskap: en handbok för kvinnor [Freedom, Equality and Sisterhood: A handbook for women] (in Swedish). Stockholm, Sweden: Författarförlaget. ISBN 978-9-170-54075-2.
- Johnston, Jill (1973). Lesbian Nation: The Feminist Solution. New York, New York: Simon and Schuster. ISBN 978-0-671-21433-3.
- Koedt, Anne (1968). The Myth of the Vaginal Orgasm. Adelaide, South Australia: Women's Liberation Movement of Adelaide. OCLC 741539766. In 1970 editions were released in London and Boston.
- Kool-Smit, J. E. (1967). "Het onbehagen bij de vrouw" [The Discontent of Women] (PDF). De Gids (in Dutch) (9–10): 267–281. ISSN 0016-9730. Archived from the original (PDF) on 12 April 2018.
- Mainardi, Pat (1970). The Politics of Housework. Boston, Massachusetts: New England Free Press. OCLC 41038147.
- Millett, Kate (1970). Sexual politics. New York, New York: Ballantine Books. ISBN 978-0-345-29270-4.
- Mitchell, Juliet (1971). Woman's Estate. Harmondsworth, Middlesex, England: Penguin. ISBN 978-0-14-021425-3.
- Morgan, Elaine (1972). The Descent of Woman. London, England: Souvenir Press. ISBN 978-0-285-62063-6.
- Morgan, Robin (1970). Sisterhood Is Powerful: An Anthology of Writings from Women's Liberation Movement. New York, New York: Random House. ISBN 978-0-394-70539-2. OCLC 606144056.
- Rich, Adrienne (1976). Of Woman Born: Motherhood as Experience and Institution. New York, New York: Bantam Books. ISBN 978-0-553-11365-5.
- Sarachild, Kathie (1970). "A Program for Feminist 'Consciousness Raising'". Notes from the Second Year. New York, New York: Radical Feminism: 78–80. OCLC 70702435.
- Sarachild, Kathie (1973). "Consciousness Raising: A Radical Weapon" (PDF). Feminist Revolution. New York, New York: Redstockings: 144–150. Archived from the original (PDF) on 27 March 2018.
- Vinder, K. (pseud.) (1975). Kvinde kend din krop: En håndbog [Woman know your body: A handbook] (in Danish). Copenhagen, Denmark: Tiderne Skifter. ISBN 978-8-779-736-252.

== Criticism ==
The philosophy practiced by liberationists assumed a global sisterhood of support working to eliminate inequality without acknowledging that women were not united; other factors, such as age, class, ethnicity, and opportunity (or lack thereof) created spheres wherein women's interests diverged, and some women felt underrepresented by the WLM. While many women gained an awareness of how sexism permeated their lives, they did not become radicalized and were uninterested in overthrowing society. They made changes in their lives to address their individual needs and social arrangements, but were unwilling to take action on issues that might threaten their socio-economic status. Liberationist theory also failed to recognize a fundamental difference in fighting oppression. Combating sexism had an internal component, whereby one could change the basic power structures within family units and personal spheres to eliminate the inequality. Class struggle and the fight against racism are solely external challenges, requiring public action to eradicate inequality.

There was criticism of the movement not only from factions within the movement itself, but from outsiders, like Hugh Hefner, Playboy founder, who launched a campaign to expose all the "highly irrational, emotional, kookie trends" of feminism in an effort to tear apart feminist ideas that were "unalterably opposed to the romantic boy-girl society" promoted by his magazine. "Women's libbers" were widely characterized as "man-haters" who viewed men as enemies, advocated for all-women societies, and encouraged women to leave their families behind. Semanticist Nat Kolodney argued that while women were oppressed by social structures and rarely served in tyrannical roles over the male population as a whole, men, in general, were not oppressors of women either. Instead, social constructs and the difficulty of removing systems which had long served their purpose exploited both men and women. Women's liberationists acknowledged that patriarchy affects both men and women, with the former receiving many privileges from it, but focused on the impact of systemic sexism and misogyny on women throughout the world.

To many women activists in the American Indian Movement, black Civil Rights Movement, Chicana Movement, as well as Asians and other minorities, the activities of the primarily white, middle-class women in the women's liberation movement were focused specifically on sex-based violence and the social construction of gender as a tool of sex-based oppression. By evaluating all economic, socio-cultural, and political issues through the lens of sexism without pairing it with racism and classism, liberationists often poorly represented women of color in their analyses. While women of color recognized that sexism was an issue, some did not see how it could be separated from the issue of race or class, which compounds to impact their access to education, health care, housing, jobs, legal justice, and the poverty and violence which permeates their lives. For women who did not speak English, or spoke it as a second language, sexism had little to do with the ability to protect herself or utilize existing systems.

The focus on personal freedom was another divergence between white women and women of color. Some did not see the intrinsic connection between the liberation of women and the liberation of men that was advocated for by the Women's Liberation Movement and felt that feminists did not care about the inequalities suffered by men; they felt that the liberation of women without the liberation of men from policies that keep men of color from obtaining jobs and limit their civil rights, further preventing them from being able to protect their families, neither improved humanity as a whole nor improved the plight experienced by families. Dorothy Height, president of the National Council of Negro Women, expressed that the best way black women could help themselves was to help their men gain equality.

Regarding the "sex-positive" sect that broke away from the women's liberation movement, extending personal freedom to sexual freedom, the meaning of being free to have relations with whoever one wanted, was lost on black women who had been sexually assaulted and raped with impunity for centuries or Native Women who were routinely sterilized. Their issues were not about limiting their families but having the freedom to form families. It had very little meaning in the traditional Chicana culture wherein women were required to be virgins until marriage and remain naïve in her marriage. Though invited to participate within the Women's Liberation Movement, many women of color cautioned against the single focus on sexism, finding it to be an incomplete analysis without the consideration of racism. Likewise, though many lesbians saw commonalities with Women's Liberation through the goals of eponymous liberation from sex-based oppression, which included fighting against homophobia, others believed that the focus was too narrow to confront the issues they faced.

Differences in the understanding of gender and how it relates to and informs sex-based oppression and systemic sexism called attention to differences in issues. For example, many liberationists rejected the performance of femininity as positive behavior, which meant that white lesbians who actively chose to perform femininity had to decide between their desire to be feminine-presenting and their rejection of sexual objectification. Jackie Anderson, an activist, and philosopher observed that in the black lesbian community being able to dress up made them feel confident because, during the workweek, black women had to conform to dress codes imposed upon them. This was and continues to be a sentiment held by most women, who tend to believe that the feeling of confidence derived from performing femininity as dictated by the sexist status quo is the same as empowerment.

== See also ==
- Feminism
- Lesbian feminism
- Radical feminism
- Men's liberation movement
- Riot Grrrl
