= Margaret Barr (choreographer) =

Australian choreographer and teacher of dance-drama

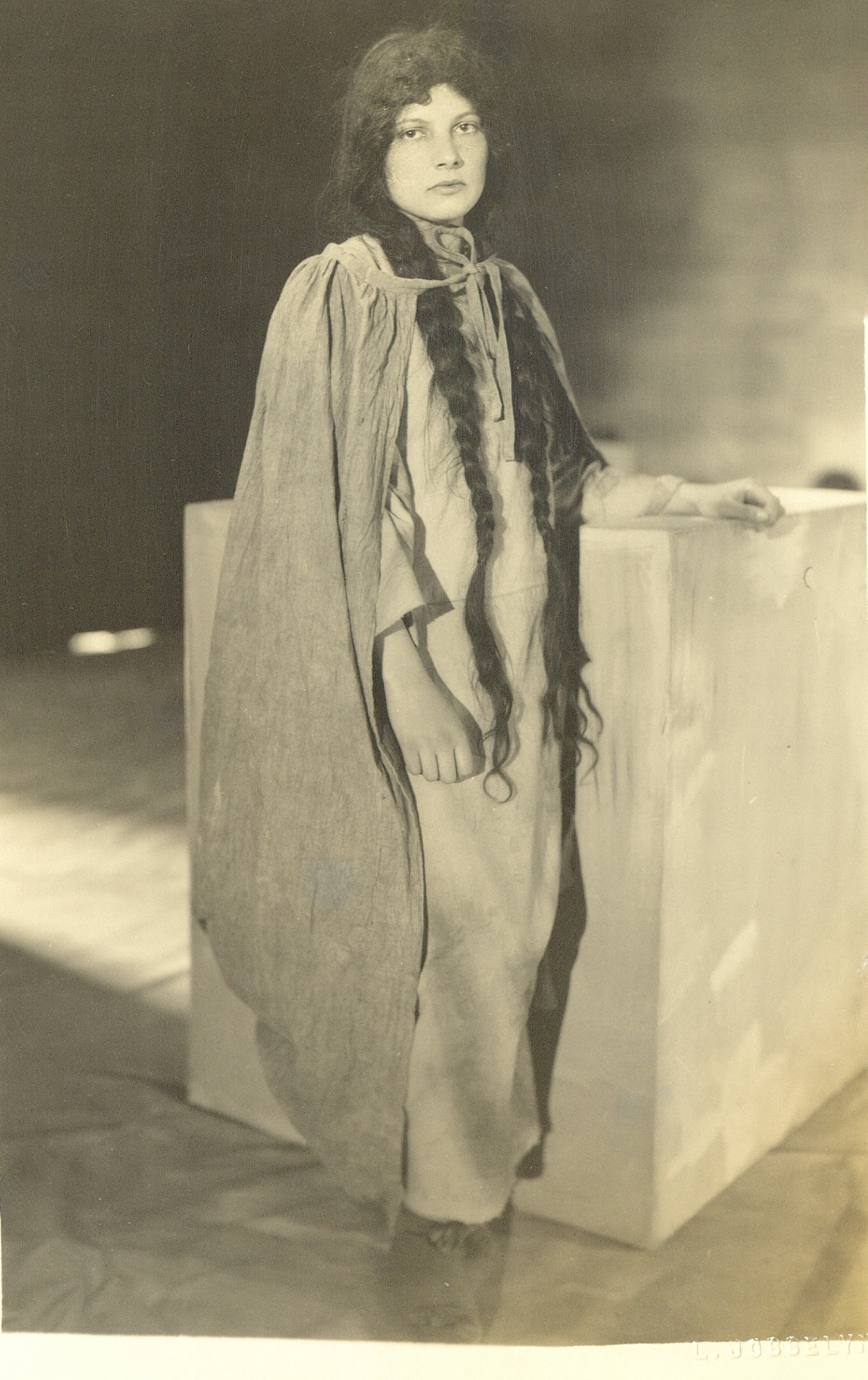
- Margaret Barr in play The Mother of Gregory (1924)
- Born: 29 November 1904; Bombay, India
- Died: 29 May 1991 (aged 86); Sydney, Australia
- Known for: Dance and choreography
- Movement: Modern dance
- Spouse: Douglas Hart (m. 1936–1950)

Margaret Barr (29 November 1904 – 29 May 1991) was an Australian choreographer and teacher of dance-drama who worked in the United States, England, New Zealand and Australia. During a career of more than sixty years, she created over eighty works.

Born in India, she spent parts of her adulthood in England and the United States. As an adult, she studied dance with Martha Graham in New York, and then moved to England. There, she formed dance groups in London, taught dance-mime at Dartington Hall School in Devon, and choreographed and produced dance-dramas on contemporary topics. In 1939, after marrying a conscientious objector, she moved with him to New Zealand, where she taught dance, movement and improvisation and developed further works. Around 1950, she left New Zealand for Australia, where she spent the rest of her life. For about forty years, she taught dance-drama classes developed from the ideas of Martha Graham and Konstantin Stanislavski. She led the Margaret Barr Dance Drama Group, mounting major productions every year. She also taught movement and improvisation at the National Institute of Dramatic Art for seventeen years. Her works explored many social issues, including the environment, relationships between peoples, strong women, pacificism, and ideas from works of art and literature.

== Early life and education ==
Barr was born in Bombay, India, in 1904 to Mungo Barr, an American-born dentist, and his English wife Margaret (née Aukett), a nurse. She had one younger sister, Betty. After time spent with other family members in the United States and England, Margaret and her sister settled with their parents in Santa Barbara, California, where Barr graduated from Santa Barbara High School in 1922. They studied drama with Little Theatre Movement founders Maurice Browne and Ellen Van Volkenburg, and dance in the Denishawn style with Martha Graham's sister Geordie, then briefly ran their own dance school. In 1927, they moved to New York, where Margaret Barr studied dance with Martha Graham. Barr's first works, Earth Mother and Hebridean Suite, were choreographed while she was there; she continued to produce Hebridean Suite until the 1970s, and it was one of the works performed at a festival to celebrate the centenary of Barr's birth in 2004.

== Career ==
=== England, 1929–1939 ===
In 1929, Barr left New York for London, where she formed a group called The Workshop of Modern Dance. After Dorothy Elmhirst attended the group's debut performance in 1930, Barr was invited to teach at Dartington Hall School in Devon. Also in 1930, Barr choreographed the dance movements in the West End production of Othello in which Paul Robeson and Peggy Ashcroft starred.

At Dartington Hall, Barr taught dance-mime. Dance historian Garry Lester has explained, "The work was called 'dance-mime' for very clear reasons: the choreography clearly had movement as its basis, valuing and using the attributes of modern dance (in terms of the form it took, the structuring of component parts and the movement style), and relied equally on finding and sustaining through improvisation the character of the protagonists within each of her works." Barr formed a core group of professional dancers, and taught both students at the school and, through the Workers' Educational Association, groups of people from the surrounding communities. Her classes involved "Graham exercises: stretching, bending, leaping, rolling over, muscle by muscle, on the floor" and "exploring the movement impulse, its stylisation and the range of dynamics (from lyrical to staccato) available to a dancer". Theatre producer Maurice Browne, reviewing productions at Dartington Hall, commented on the highly developed technique shown by performers who had never danced nor appeared on stage previously, demonstrating Barr's talent for developing individual skills to the highest level possible.

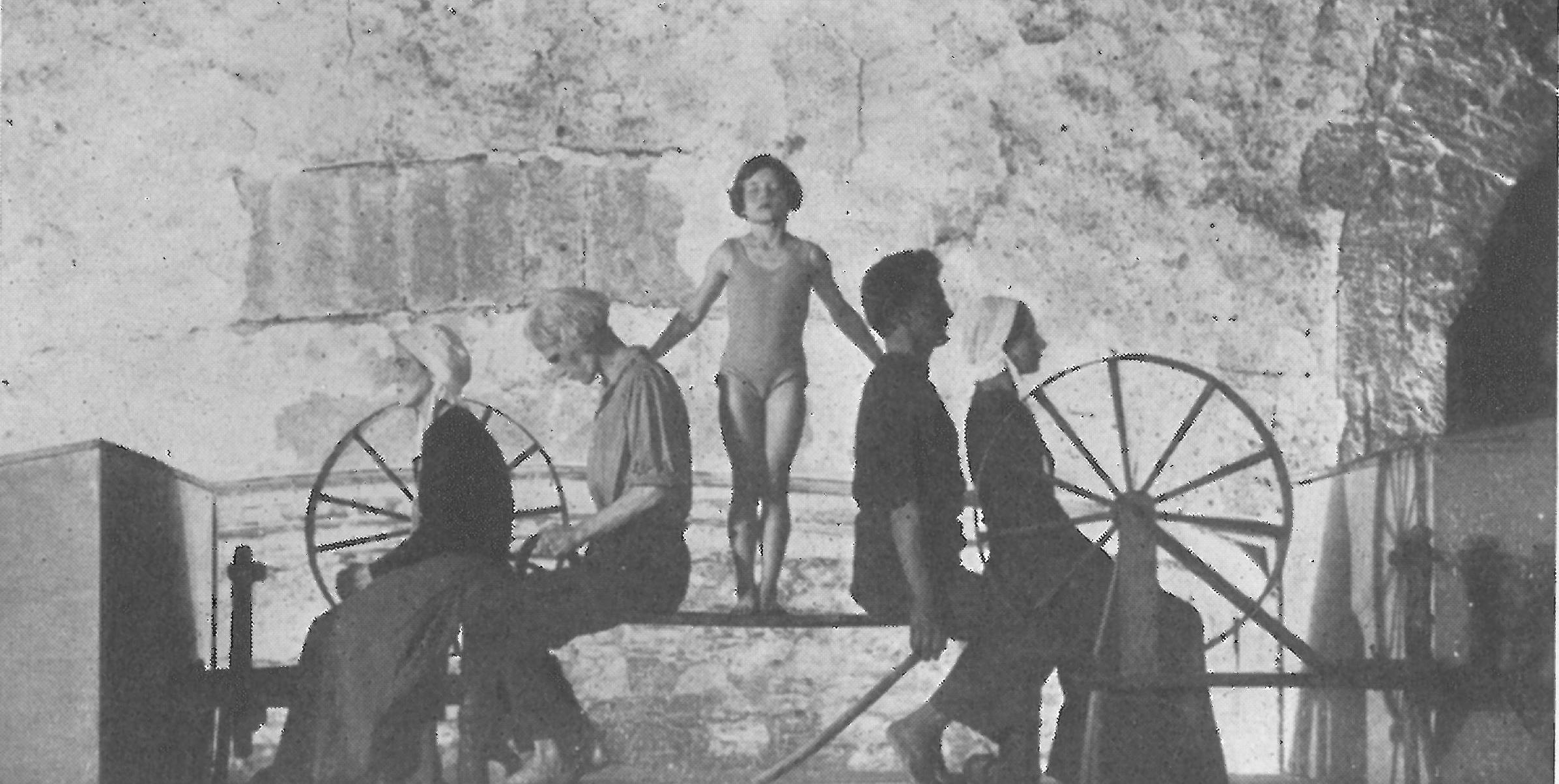
Scene from dance mime The Child, Dartington Hall, Devon, 1931

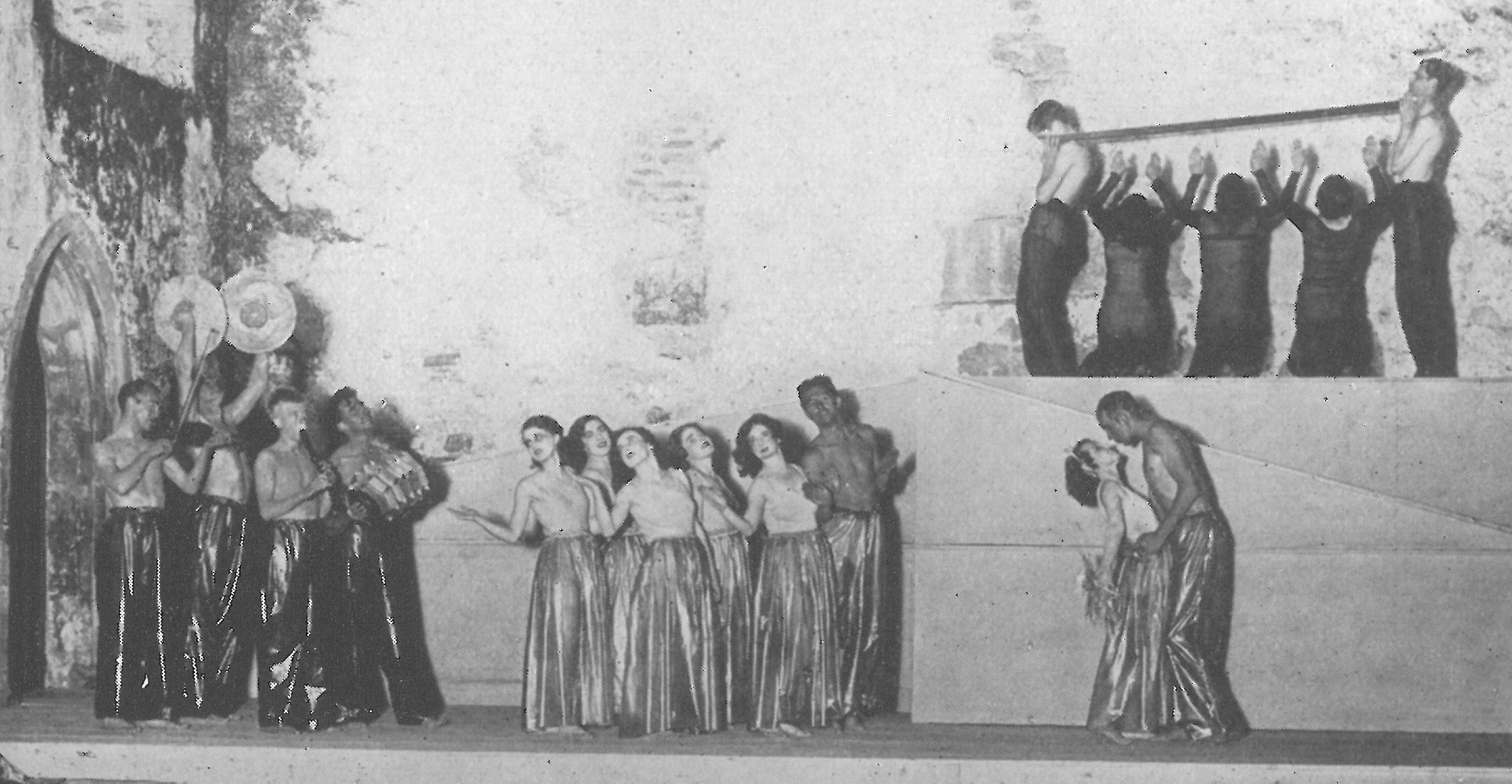
Scene from dance mime Factory, Dartington Hall, Devon, 1931

Barr choreographed works for large groups: Browne described seeing a performance by about forty or fifty people whose occupations included schoolchildren and teachers, clerical workers and farmers, housemaids and stonemasons. Several reviewers were struck by the way some pieces "welded the group of thirty adults into a unity that was so purposeful that no one in the audience was left unmoved"; in particular, dance critic John Martin wrote: "The unity of spirit with which they worked together provided a model of ensemble playing." Lester observes that "Margaret practised the politics of inclusion, with a simple pre-requisite: participants must show commitment to the work itself and the idea of a 'group'."

Among the works Barr created while at Dartington were: from 1931, Funeral and Wedding, to music by Cyril Scott; The Factory, representing the rhythmical movements of machines and workers, including an accident; Plain Song; The Child; Medieval Dance (later Medieval Suite), with music by Edmund Rubbra; and Sea Sketches, which included "vocal sounds"; from 1932: The People, to music by Donald Pond; Sibelius, set to Sibelius' Symphony No. 1 in E Minor; Song of Young Women; from 1934: The Family, with music by Rubbra; The Three Marys; The Three Sisters, in which three women (a prostitute, a spinster and a young girl) show their reactions to war; Epithalamium (inspired by an affair Barr had with Dorothy Elmhirst's 16-year-old son Michael Straight) and Colliery (for which Barr visited a coal mining community in Northumberland).

In 1934, German exile Kurt Jooss and his dance group arrived at Dartington, and Barr resigned rather than work under Jooss' direction. She became director of a permanent corps de ballet attached to the new Experimental Theatre in London. Its first production was Pacific, incorporating Polynesian dances. It was at this time that Barr began using the term "dance-drama". Her works from this period carried pacifist and communist-derived political messages, and were set to music by contemporary composers such as Edmund Rubbra and Michael Tippett. She contributed to the 1938 Festival of Co-operation at Wembley Stadium, directed by André van Gyseghem, by training "a ballet of mourning women and a ballet of exultant men of the future".

Critics had strong, and strongly contrasting, responses to Barr's work in England. W. A. Darlington, reviewing a performance at the Arts Theatre, London, described it as "nothing better than posturing and pattern-weaving ... [despite] "moments of sheer beauty — especially in The Three Sisters and in a little Hebridean scene, The Storm ... immense pains and skill were being wasted".

Dance critic Fernau Hall described many of Barr's works from the Dartington and London periods in his 1950 book Modern English Ballet: An Interpretation. Although Hall thought that some individual pieces were failures (describing Means Test (1937) as a "propaganda work" in which "the movements [were] so vague that the result had little meaning"), overall, he considered that "Margaret Barr has considerable importance in the history of English ballet. She was the only English choreographer to concentrate on contemporary subjects, and the first English artistic director to give consistent encouragement to experimental work and contemporary composers. Her artistic standards were so high that designers like Goffin, and composers like Rubbra, Rawsthorne and Tippett were proud to work with her."

Barr married Douglas Bruce Hart, a carpenter and communist, in London in 1936. As Hart was a pacifist and conscientious objector, the couple moved to New Zealand in 1939 to avoid conscription during WWII.

=== New Zealand, 1939–1949 ===
In New Zealand, Barr taught movement and improvisation at the Workers' Educational Association in Auckland. She developed two works in collaboration with poet R. A. K. Mason, China (1943) and Refugee (1945). Processions (1943) is another work created during Barr's time in New Zealand; its final section, 'May Day', was performed at a May Day celebration in Auckland in 1944. Other works performed in New Zealand included Hebridean, Three Women, Funeral and Wedding, Breadline, and Factory.

=== Australia, c. 1950–1990 ===
In 1949 or 1952, Barr sailed to Sydney, Australia, with her partner (Note: According to the Australian Dictionary of Biography, Barr's marriage with Hart had ended before she left New Zealand, and she sailed with a new partner, Walter Brown. A contemporary newspaper report indicates that she sailed to Australia with Hart.) in a yacht they had built. She started a dance studio and established the Sydney Dance-Drama Group (called the Margaret Barr Dance-Drama Group from 1968). In the early years, she worked as a cleaner, and trained and rehearsed the dance-drama group on two evenings a week. From 1955 until 1990, productions of her dance-dramas were presented annually, usually introducing a new work each year, as well as reprising and sometimes revising earlier works. She was also a member of the Maritime Industries Theatre amateur dramatic group.

Barr became the first movement tutor at the newly established National Institute of Dramatic Art (NIDA) in 1959, a position she held for seventeen years. She also taught improvisation to first year students, and ran workshops at universities in regional New South Wales, in Melbourne, and in Brisbane.

A participant in the 1961 NIDA Summer School of Drama described Barr as "a dynamic woman in a black leotard, her gestures like those of the Winged Victory, her commands like those of a Sar'-Major. As you sit on the polished floor in your playsuit, you wiggle and wiggle, throw your arms away, loll your head about and strive to obey while Miss Barr goes around exhorting, commanding, her tread like a panther's, her vitality leading you from one exercise to another in ceaseless activity for a full hour. Having changed, and dismissed the notion that after an hour with Margaret Barr work should be finished for the day, you set out for your next class".

In addition to her work at NIDA and with the dance-drama group, Barr was called on to develop choreography for other productions, including The Royal Hunt of the Sun for the Adelaide Festival of Arts in 1966. She collaborated with playwright Mona Brand in several works, and choreographed Austrian-Australian composer Eric Gross's Sinfonietta in 1965.

Barr died in Sydney at the Royal North Shore Hospital, the year after producing her last work, The Countess (1990).

== The Margaret Barr Dance-Drama Group ==
=== Members ===
The Margaret Barr Dance-Drama Group (until 1968, called the Sydney Dance-Drama Group) was an amateur group, in that members earned their living in other ways, and trained during free time. Its members were students in Barr's dance-drama evening classes. During the 1950s, the group had thirteen members; by 1959, it had grown to thirty dancers; and by 1967 to forty.

The group did not have principal dancers or stars. The names of the performers were listed on programs, but without any indication of the parts they had danced. Members of the Margaret Barr Dance-Drama Group did "not have to have good legs; nor do they have to be people of a certain ideal age or shape," so Barr "achieved in her group a small cross-section of the world illuminating human experience." As a 1959 article explained, "technique is made to serve expression and not vice versa, as with classical ballet."

=== Style ===
Barr taught her students techniques of relaxation and contraction, as the impulses from which movement arises, as well as physical training in strength, suppleness, stretching, balancing and coordinating movements, mime, and awareness of their internal and external experiences.

She attributed to Martha Graham the new "vocabulary" of her dance, "a carefully worked out series of staccato postures and relaxed gestures designed to express the whole range of human feeling." She said,

Martha worked out the vocabulary while I have added the idea of drama — particularly along the Stanislavski lines. The gestures are words, so to speak. We put the words into sentences, tell a story with them, add music and produce a work.

Dance historian Lester has pointed out, however, that "at the time in which she studied with Graham (1927–1928) there was no 'technique'; Graham had only just embarked upon her own creative journey."

Barr drew on various dance traditions in her choreography, including some classical ballet poses and movements of the legs and folk dances. She also incorporated everyday movements and gymnastics. Depending on the concepts being conveyed, dancers sometimes moved all or part of their bodies in one place, held positions, or travelled across the stage, walking, running, jumping, shuffling or crawling. Gestures of the head, arms and upper torso signified communication or emotions. Lifts, balances and use of props to achieve height might signify conflict, dominance, or celebration. As reviewers noted, to Barr, "Modern dance ... is always about something", and her choreography was "free in movement, yet giving every movement meaning".

While some works were or included duets, most of Barr's choreography involved groups. Sometimes two or more groups were performing different activities in different parts of the set. Barr's stage sets and props were minimal, and included platforms, benches, chairs, and ladders, all creating height; plastic representing snow or green cloth representing water; ropes, gymnastic hoops and other tubular shapes; metal rods and wires, and frames made of metal, wood or other materials to represent buildings or mountains.

Costumes varied from unitards or flowing gowns with simple lines, to traditional wear such as kimono or Central American costumes, and appropriate period or occupational dress, such as coat, vest and tie, hard hats, bathing costumes or 1950s blouses and full skirts. They were found or made by members of the group. Accessories such as parasoles, fans, masks, flags, musical instruments, guns and helmets, etc., were also used.

From the late 1950s, Barr took the "daring step" of including spoken words in her works, as well as music and movement. One critic described this as "a vocal and visual partnership", and explained that "Movement came first, but as [Barr] found more and more she wanted to say — tackling the work and concepts of poets and philosophers — the words had to be added."

Barr, as a person and as a teacher, was described as "intimidating and uncompromising ... The personal style remains direct and very no-nonsense, the Barr class continues to be the toughest, a hard-driving achievement in endurance." She described herself as "too selfish" to collaborate with other choreographers.

=== Works and themes ===
The scope of Barr's oeuvre has been described as "seemingly boundless"; her obituary in The Sydney Morning Herald mentioned "topics as diverse as the work of Mahatma Gandhi and Margaret Mead, drought and the Melbourne Cup." Several broad themes, "all ... express[ing] her social consciousness", can be discerned in her dance-dramas: the Australian environment, peoples and history, or "the cultural expressions of Australia's attitudes to living"; strong women; political issues and anti-war works. She also sometimes derived inspiration for pieces from paintings and from poetry and other works of literature. Many works explored more than one theme, and had multiple inspirations.

==== Australian themes ====
Reviewers during the 1950s commented that Barr was "tackling seriously and with considerable ability the creation of Australian characters and the expression in dramatic form of many aspects of our Australian life". These themes included the Australian environment and its weather, as well as historical events and relationships between different peoples with Australia.

- Australian Suite, focusing largely on natural events, comprised:

Flood (1955), with music by Roy Agnew, and "dramatic groupings, lighting and movement [which] created a powerful impression by their tension and simplicity";

Bushfire (1955), with music by Dag Wirén, which was "stark ... in [the last scene] the burnt-out house is rebuilt by the neighbours in a burst of companionable joie de vivre"; and
The Breaking of the Drought (1958), with music by Australian composer Arnold Butcher, which combined the themes of the environment and relationships between Aboriginal and white Australians, presenting "a story of struggle between whites and blacks for a desert waterhole"; while "whirlwinds writhe across the burning plain. Kangaroos, birds and lizards pass in a most effective evocation of a merciless drought in the outback."

- Postscript from Queensland (by 1958), "amusing and joyful", was set to music by Sergei Prokofiev, and depicted a visit to the Currumbin Bird Sanctuary, in which the dancers "as honey-eaters, rainbow lorikeets, green leeks, soldier birds, spangled drongos, budgerigars and kingfishers hold and absorb one's interest as they swoop, scream and swerve down to take the food proffered by the visitors."
- Snowy! (1961) showed the landscape of the Snowy Mountains, and the workers on the Snowy Mountains Hydro-electric Scheme at work and at play. The music was composed by John Antill, initially only for piano. Snowy! was filmed twice: first in 1961, when the stage version was filmed by the Australian Broadcasting Corporation (this version was broadcast by the ABC on Wednesday 4 October 1961); and again at Easter 1962, as an entry for the 1962 Prix Italia, when a version was produced that complied with the rules of the competition (which required professional dancers and a time limit of thirty minutes). The second version was screened on ABC TV on 8 May 1963. Antill orchestrated his score for eleven instruments, mainly brass and percussion, and it was recorded by the Sydney Symphony Orchestra, conducted by Antill himself. The 1962 TV version included verse by Mona Brand, spoken by Leonard Teale.
- Coming of the Rains (by 1963), with music by Australian composer Laurie Hagerty, included a "celebration of the blood of the earth poignantly caught by the bodies of the dancers", and "a lyric pas de deux showing lively feeling and simple original movement."
- Australian Scene (by 1963), with music by John Antill, in which "the dancers, without any decor or stage properties, evoked an eroded and drought-stricken landscape. The massed groups of dancers forming a symbol of a solitary tree with outstretched branches on a bare plain, was a piece of inspired originality. The crown of the tree, a supported dancer, is struck off. The tree withers, contracts, and is reduced to a deformed, tragically sculptural symbol."
- The Explorers (1963) "depicts the arrival of the early explorers in Australia, their search into the unknown, while the gay Sydney colony lived on quite unaware of the tragedies occurring inland. Miss Barr once again created strong contrasts with the two topics being danced simultaneously on the stage or in the auditorium." It drew inspiration from Patrick White's novel Voss, and had music by Laurie Hagerty.
- First Tuesday, 11th Month, 2.43p.m., Melbourne (1967), with music by Laurie Hagerty, "captured with gusto and eagle-eye detail, the humour and ridiculous power that the Melbourne Cup holds over the bulk of the population."
- Wild Colonial Boy (1987), "a black satire with music sung by Cecil Grivas", "a slapstick roughcut ... that has something serious to convey behind its hearty jocularity."

Other works which focused on conflict and reconciliation between the original inhabitants of Australia, the non-Aboriginal population, and post-WWII immigrants included:

- The Fence (1953), "quite the most successful", "a portrayal of the barriers existing in the minds of Australians against migrants", or "between the confident, arrogant Australian and the black-shawled, tentative New Australian".
- Three Households (1959), with music by Australian composer Bruce Hembrowe, depicting "racial prejudice and the country town "Little Rocks" of Australia."
- Our Son, Our Daughter (1960), with music and poetry by Bruce Hembrowe, "invoking the classic tragedy of the Houses of Montague and Capulet, [which] has for its theme that "each new generation has its rebellious ones" ... Lyrical in concept, and most satisfying in this imaginative work, were the two Love Dances — the first, tentative and exploratory in the discovery of lover — the second, tender and passionate in its affirmation. These were well understood and beautifully realised by the two dancers."
- Landscape with Figures (1967), to Australian composer Clive Douglas' Symphony 11 "Namatjira", explored the impact of white people's invasion of Australia on Aboriginal people. The building of settlements was symbolised by a house with red roof timbers, inspired by paintings by Lawrence Daws. The work elicited different responses, one reviewer considering that "Miss Barr's rapier thrust on this subject had devastating impact. The provocative truth in the progressive despoiling of the land and its people was held taut. ... A moment of poignancy was beautifully portrayed by the trio of Aborigines as one dancer melted into a backbend beneath the spear he and his two women held aloft. The white creatures stood in line facing them, dominating them as the brown bodies tilted and fell in controlled yielding to the irresistible psychological pressuring. The point was underlined at the end of the Station section when the native woman backed across the footlights, travelling on her knees and cradling a garbage tin in her arms. The station mistress, standing high above her on a Victorian chair, archly and in dainty finality placed the liquor bottle, symbol of utter dissolution, into the garbage." Another reviewer, however, felt that the scene was too obvious, and that the "disturbing unsubtleties" were comic rather than moving.
- Three Sisters of Katoomba (1975), "a delicious spoof on tourists, in their natural habitat in the revolving (revolting!) restaurant at Katoomba", which "satirises the plastic tourism of this mountain town set against ancient natural splendour and Aboriginal folklore".
- Aide Memoir 1788 1888 1988 (1988) depicted laws relating to Aboriginal welfare over the two hundred years following British colonisation of Australia.

==== Women ====
Another recurring theme in Barr's work was the portrayal of strong women.

- Colonial portraits (1957), to music by Elgar, depicted the lives of three 19th-century Australian women: Daisy Bates, "tragic and lonely", who worked with Aboriginal people for many years; Mrs Bentley, the wife of the hotelkeeper at the Eureka Rebellion, and Mary McLeod Shanahan, the wife of a miner on the Ballarat goldfield, who (in this work) made the Eureka Flag. It combined dance and music with words, and "convincingly and imaginatively evokes the different natures of these three women."
- (Ballad of) The Drover's Wife (1964), with music by Australian composer John Gordon, was inspired by Henry Lawson's short story and by Russell Drysdale's painting of the same name. It was described by one reviewer as "original, dynamic and most entertaining"; to that reviewer, it was "more convincing and vivid [in 1964] than the slightly altered version performed" in 1965, but another review in 1965 noted that "it was the item the audience enjoyed most. It told its story of shearing, of drunkenness, of love and loss of companionship and desolation in a simple, often tender manner."
- Fleur-de-Lis (by 1970), presenting the lives of Eleanor of Aquitaine, George Sand and Marie Curie.
- Portrait of a Lady with the CBE (1971), "a somewhat quirky look at Daisy Bates to the accompaniment of extracts from her diary and Aboriginal music."
- Judith Wright — Australian Poet (1974), set to 26 of Judith Wright's poems, depicting themes including Wright's ancestry, Aboriginal culture, war and pollution. In 1981, a forty-minute film showing Barr working with her students to rehearse this piece was made by a former student, Lois Ellis.
- New Sonnets from the Portuguese (1975), with music incorporating guitars and castanets, was based on the book New Portuguese Letters, written by the Three Marias, Maria Isabel Barreno, Maria Teresa Horta and Maria Velho da Costa. The dance-drama "cover[ed] the denial of female sexuality, the restriction of women to the home, child bearing and support of the husband, and the double moral standard of the Portuguese Penal Code." One reviewer found it "disappoint[ing] ... the movement was not as strong as the spoken words to which it was set. Admittedly, the basis of this ballet ... would overwhelm almost any other means of presenting it, such is its content of discrimination against women. But I am accustomed to Margaret Barr achieving the impossible".
- Climbers (1976), "an allegory ...on the international struggle for women's liberation ... drawn from the Japanese women's ascent of Mount Everest in 1975", was set to music by Alan Hovhaness. A contemporary reviewer described it as "astonishingly effective, with ingenious sets. The interesting symbolism of the theme is graphically presented." A 29-minute film of this dance was made by director Rosalind Gillespie (who had previously studied dance with Barr), with cinematography by Martha Ansara. In 1980, the film of Climbers won the Silver Plaque at the 16th Chicago International Dance Film Festival.
- Katherine Mansfield 1888–1923 (1978) with a script by Joan Scott which was spoken live during performance by the dancers, and by an actor and actress. Two dancers played Mansfield simultaneously, as "Katherine Mansfield had spoken of herself at times as a multiple person".
- Margaret Mead (1979) had a script by Lesma Sturmer, based on Mead's writings.
- Women Climbing Mountains (1981) was developed in collaboration with former student Lois Ellis especially to be filmed. Ellis felt that the theme of climbing symbolised Barr's celebration of effort in her work. The physical shape of the mountains climbed in the dance-drama were based on the form of Henry Moore's sculpture Seated Woman in the National Gallery of Victoria.
- Pueblo de Maiz (1987), based on the life of Rigoberta Menchú, depicted Guatemalan culture and oppression. The script was co-written by Joan Scott, and the music was composed by El Salvadorean Ricardo Andino. The Sydney Morning Herald reviewer felt that despite the concepts, original songs and music, and authentic costuming, the dancer in the central role lacked intensity, and "the scenes of village life, alternating between joy and tragedy, proceed without the core of a single strong performance to draw them together."

==== Anti-war ====
- Three Women (by 1941; revised from the 1930s Three Sisters), with music by Rubbra; "an acid commentary in the circumstances of war." "Grouping and lighting for "Three Women" ranged from the graphic indictment of a Daumier composition to the rich glooms and glowing highlights of a Rembrandt composition."
- Processions (1943) was described by a reviewer in 1960 as "probably the choreographer's most powerful creation". It comprised three sections: " 'Carnivale', reworked over the years to reflect changes in social and political attitudes; 'In der Nacht' [In the night] ... an anti-war statement [with] a woman playing the violin being attacked by a helmeted soldier ... [and] 'May Day' ... a celebration of youth in harmonious movement". In the 1960 performance, the final section was changed to "an example of symphonic choreography which interprets the verse of Dylan Thomas — 'tomorrow-treading' and 'the star-gestured children.'
- Mothers (1956) comprised "five beautifully staged movements ... their evocative groupings represent the theme of mother and child in five stages of the life-process ... all stages threatened by the drums of war."
- A Small People (1966), with music by Villa-Lobos, was "a most effective and artistically realised affirmation of support for the Vietnamese people in their struggle against American intervention. Miss Barr and her dancers portrayed graphically and movingly the assault on the Vietnamese people's customs and national dignity, the ballet's final sequence ("We face you, you Big Peoples, and are on our guard") showing them entwined in barbed wire but still offering defiant resistance." One segment featured a duet of "Music" fighting a soldier; one reviewer considered "the patterns of [this] duet ... highly original ... the effect was stirring. The death of "Music" was poignant until the gunman was required to kick and roll the corpse across the whole wide width of the stage over and over." Another reviewer, seeing a 1973 performance, wrote, "the duel ... between a violin bow and a shotgun was high drama, well sustained, designed and lit." " "In the Mekong Delta" cleverly contrast[ed] peace and shattering war among Vietnam peasants, but expanded with excessive repetition and leisure." "harmonious, well fitted to its Villa Lobos music and there is some memorable beauty in its love duet."

In 1967, the year after the debut of A Small People, Barr collaborated with Mona Brand and Pat Barnett in On Stage Vietnam, a "theatre of fact", comprising "film, slides, drama, folk songs, revue type sketches, and dance drama", to which, the Bulletin reviewer wrote, "the choreography by Margaret Barr adds distinction." Another reviewer wrote, "one of the highlights is [Barr's] imaginative interpretations of the battle of Dien Bien Phu in dance form."

- The Hurdlers (1969) was "a symbolic look at war and conscription and the harassment of those who do not conform." It was first performed at the 1969 Ballet Australia choreography competition. Sydney Morning Herald dance reviewer Beth Dean considered that "once again [Barr's] sense of timing for theatre impact was astray. The opening picture, excellent in itself, was so prolonged that we began to wonder how much longer these obedient dancers could cling immobile to their gymnasium rings ... The bizarre ugliness of the mob with blind-man's white sticks beating a defenceless couple follows ... the ever-recurring thread in Barr works: the downtrodden will be vindicated." A reviewer for The Bulletin contrasted Barr's work in this piece with developments in modern dance elsewhere: "In New York choreography grows yearly more frenetic: in "The Hurdlers" Barr explores the possibilities of stasis, of long passages with dancers suspended and still above the stage."
- A Day in the Life of Mahatma Gandhi (1982), which "conveys a feeling of the contrasts in India that brought the country to crisis in Gandhi's lifetime: dust, poverty and desperation among the Indians against the autocratic, leisured luxury (relatively speaking) of the British Raj." The Sydney Morning Herald reviewer considered that, "One of her most memorable tableaus depicted an English-woman observing the masses from a great height — literally, in statuesque pose on the shoulders of one of her guards." However, that reviewer found that words dominated movement in the work, and it was overall "a rather sketchy documentary".
- O Padre (1984), which explored the Catholic Church's reactions to priests' and nuns' commitment to liberation theology.
- The Doctor (1989) was inspired by a Canadian doctor who took blood banks to theatres of war in Spain and China.

==== Inspired by paintings ====
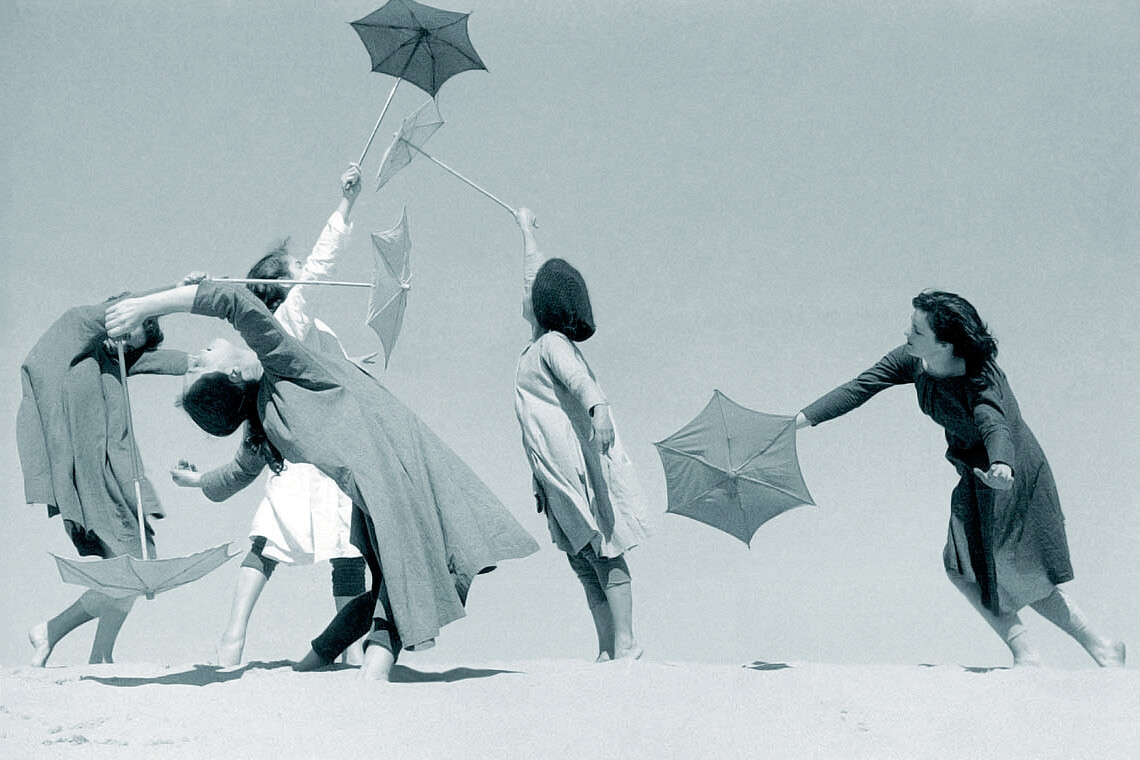
Margaret Barr's Strange Children, 1955

- Breadline (c. 1929), depicting "the ultimate in human suffering and anguish" with "dramatic intensity", was based on Käthe Kollwitz' drawings of a 19th-century German weavers' strike and set to music by Lord Berners. First developed in London, it was revived and presented in Australia in 1955 and subsequent years.
- Strange Children (1955), described as "a penetrating analysis of the perverse behaviour of modern children", with "brilliant and colourful sequences" which "looks at how adults enforce behaviour and conformity upon their children" and "authentically carried us into the child's world", was based on the painting of the same name by Elaine Haxton, and had music by Arnold Butcher.
- A Poly-Asian Nursery Rhyme (1960), based on Paul Gauguin paintings of Tahiti, Ta Matete but "set to a Japanese folk song ... sheer delight to the eye". Ten children meet various fates, being "devoured by a ferocious crocodile, washed from their canoe, blown away by a willy-willy, and stung by bees to the accompaniment of comical and piercing shrieks."

==== Inspired by poetry ====
- Star-Gestured Children (by 1966) to Prokofiev's First Symphony, based on poems by Dylan Thomas, "a beautifully conceived and executed piece of pure lyricism which seemed to sing of what Miss Barr — and every man — considers life ought to be like."
- Homage to Garcia Lorca — A Man and a Woman of Spain (1971) was set to Richard Meale's 1964 composition Homage to Garcia Lorca and Manuel de Falla's Nights in the Gardens of Spain. This was a tribute also to Dolores Ibárruri, and depicted aspects of Spanish society, and Lorca's and Ibárruri's lives and struggles.
- Pablo Neruda (1972), performed to Neruda's poetry interspersed by music by Carl Orff and de Souza, "an interesting, at times exciting presentation. There are moments of humour and horror, joviality and lyricism ... But ... [i]t comes out as a series of costumed tableaus rather than a dance drama. It has moments of complete achievement, but between them it depreciates disappointingly."

==== Other works ====
- The Amorous bailiffs (by 1953), "playful", "amusing and joyful"
- The Hunters (by 1955);
- The First Anniversary (not new in 1955), with music by Dohnanyi
- Voyagers (1956) was set to Pictures at an Exhibition by Mussorgsky, and depicted life on board ship as symbolic of everyday life, with its storms and quests for adventure.
- Mexico! (1961) "a symbolic representation of the Spanish conquest ... of the Aztecs ... It was both coherent, and subtle in its delineation, and generated a tremendous visual excitement."
- Le Sacre du Printemps / The Rite of Spring, (1962, first produced in 1946) to music by Stravinsky, disappointed some reviewers. One commented that "[u]nexpectedly, from the choreographer's dynamic history, this came out with a gentle, lyrical, pastoral quality", which he felt failed to match "the savage harshness and tremendous vigour of the Stravinsky music." Another reviewer found it "too long a work for the continued interest to be sustained by the choreographer." Parts of it did please another reviewer: "[I]n the 'Introduction' ... [r]ecumbent dancers, in effective and evocative green costumes with white and black markings, create the primal awakening of the earth. In their groupings and movements, they become exotic plants, up-thrusting buds, spasmodic caterpillars, and beautiful, emergent butterflies."
- Medieval Masque (1965) (music by Eric Gross) and Dance for Two with Participants and Observer (music by Bartok) "were pleasurable and ingenious."
- Drawings in Time (by 1969), to music by Fišer and Castiglioni, with the theme of evolution "symbolised by a scarlet ladder mounting skyward while another, balanced on its lower rungs like an uneven seesaw, proved to be a horizontal dead end for the ape and Homo Erectus, the brute battler. Man the Thinker moved with introspective passion, one foot raised for his next step upwards. The ape frolicked through life in a fool's happy game, while Man the Brute forced his clogged feet through slow bogs of mystification. The lady gaily chatted up each in turn, and got them to play house under the ladder, but only Homo Sapiens finally got the message and took her upstairs."
- Antique Forms in an Antique Sun (1972), "based on squares, circles and triangles with the explanatory note that Chinese children ... are taught to observe people in these terms; the squares dependable, the circles devious, and the triangles unpredictable. "Antique Forms" is subtle and delightful in its revelations of human personalities and relationships, making ingenious use of its three tubular props in the appropriate shapes."
- Tents (1973), explored as "a home, a place of exhibition, a base on an expedition, as a venue for entertainment, a sanctuary for emergencies and as an Embassy — referring to the Aboriginal Embassy set up in Canberra [the year before] ... the dancers ... achieve moods of beauty, of tension, drama, power, helplessness and hilarity. ... the basic set is simply a rope hung from a collection of wires that reshape it to form the outline of whatever kind of tent is the subject of the segment."
- The Pratie Eaters (1983), "a typically idiosyncratic look at Ireland".

=== Reception ===
During the approximately forty years in which Margaret Barr choreographed and produced dance-dramas in Australia, she was "talked about, not always with much comprehension or even friendliness." One review in 1983 described the group as "a company that fairly consistently wins critical approval". Some critics saw genius, "richly imaginative choreography", and "uncompromising originality of thought." One wished "that our choreographers of classical ballet possessed just one particle of her electrical imagination." Others saw not dance, but gymnastics. Some were inspired by her themes — Mexican-American modern dancer and choreographer José Limón said, after seeing Barr's work during a visit to Australia in 1963 "The vitality of your work evokes the qualities of the land — vast, cruel, lonely." Another, writing the following year, thought that the "subject matter is hackneyed and is filled with what was once novel choreographic and mimic effects which have now become Margaret Barr cliches." A male reviewer wrote that he found it "difficult at times to agree with her simplistic and emotive views of right and wrong and a world which is exclusively inhabited by heroines."

The dancers in her group were not professionals, but students in her classes. Some reviewers saw this as detrimental to the performance, as "no great technical proficiency and no stylistic development is possible", so Barr "suffers from the inadequacy of her part-time dancers' technique which has little resiliency of power." Others saw "a highly polished and integrated ensemble with exciting athletic virtuosity", and a "group [which] dances with spirit, discipline and intelligence". One saw limited dance technique and dance vocabulary, which, however, "achieved surprisingly deep emotional impact", and another observed that "Working mostly with relatively untrained dancers, Margaret Barr communicates through movement in a way that eludes most choreographers working in Australia at the moment." Several reviewers commented on her "beautifully sculptured groups", "varied and ingenious patterns", and "control of spatial relationships", but there was also criticism of "diffuse, meaningless running about", and the "dangers inherent in Miss Barr's unflagging endeavours to capture every possible permutation of design from the human body. Movement may lose fluidity, and the shapes the dancers make sometimes seem more like anatomical experiments than movements directed to artistic purpose."

== Legacy ==
Pask wrote in his Ballet in Australia: the Second Act, 1940–1980 that, with growing interest in such pioneers of the New Dance as Isadora Duncan, the Denishawn School and Kurt Jooss, it was to be hoped that Gertrud Bodenwieser and Margaret Barr would also attract such interest, and that their "enormous individual contributions more than deserve such exposure" as would result from productions of their works across Australia.

A festival to mark the centenary of Barr's birth was held at the University of New South Wales in Sydney in 2004, with a screening of Climbers and a documentary about Barr, as well as live performances including former members of the Margaret Barr Dance-Drama Group. A reviewer commented that "Going to see performances by her group was like observing dance history in a living form: themes were current, the way of moving was from another time." The reviewer felt that some pieces, such as The Three Sisters of Katoomba and Coming of the Rains, were "more problematical for a contemporary audience", but others such as Processions, Hebridean Suite and Judith Wright — Australian Poet, were still effective and moving. A documentary called Margaret Barr: Hebridean Suite, with dancer Diane Wilder performing the piece, was broadcast on ABC TV on the Sunday Arts program in 2007, and repeated in 2008.

Different opinions have been stated about the influence of Barr's dance-drama group or her seventeen years of teaching movement and improvisation at the National Institute of Dramatic Art, from 1959 to 1975. Some members of her group went on to further study of dance, including Juliette Fisher, a New Zealander who won a scholarship to study with Martha Graham in New York, and later joined the London Contemporary Dance School, and Kai Tai Chan, a Malaysian-born dancer who founded the One Extra Dance Theatre in Sydney in 1976. Theatre director and critic Rex Cramphorn, who graduated from NIDA in 1968, saw "little evidence of [Barr's] work or methods having any impact on Sydney theatre." Theatre critic Kevon Kemp wrote, "It is with the redoubtable Miss Barr that all NIDA students explore the meaning of movement, and it is thanks to her world-class teaching that after their courses our young actors and actresses are coming forward with such mastery of the physical aspects of their art. ... the training they have with their gifted and hard-driving movement lecturer enables them to achieve many moments of distinguished and meaningful expression as dancer-actors." Reid Douglas, a drama tutor with the Arts Council and contributor to The Bulletin, observed that experiments and innovations by Barr were adopted by other choreographers some years later.

=== Film ===
- 1961 — Snowy!: Stage version, filmed by the Australian Broadcasting Corporation; broadcast by the ABC on Wednesday 4 October 1961.
- 1962 — Snowy!: Prix Italia entry, 30 mins, screened on ABC TV on 8 May 1963.
- 1972 — Daisy Bates: Series of four 30 minute episodes produced for the ABC, screened on four Sunday evenings in April–June 1972. Written by James Tulip, produced by Robert Allnutt; art by Guy Gray Smith; sung by Lauris Elms; choreographed and spoken by Margaret Barr; danced by Christine Cullen; composed by Diana Blom.
- 1977 — Dialogue: director Rosalind Gillespie, dancers Diedre Scholfield and Lindsay Anderson.
- 1980 — Climbers: Won the Silver Plaque at the 16th Chicago International Dance Film Festival. 29 mins; director Rosalind Gillespie, cinematographer Martha Ansara.
- 1981 — Judith Wright — Australian Poet: Barr rehearsing the dance-drama group; 40 mins, made by former student, Lois Ellis, for the Victorian Department of Education.
- 1981 — Women Climbing Mountains: developed in collaboration with Lois Ellis especially to be filmed.
- 1982 — A Day in the Life of Mahatma Gandhi: planned by Lois Ellis to document Barr's research in India for this dance-drama, its performance, and the influences on Barr's choreography.

== Additional sources ==
- Margaret Barr: Epic Individual, by Caryll von Sturmer. Dee Why, N.S.W. Lesma von Sturmer, pub. 1993. ISBN 0646144510
