= Margaret Barr =

Margaret Barr may refer to:

- Margaret Barr (choreographer) (1904–1991), Australian choreographer
- Margaret Elizabeth Barr-Bigelow (1923–2008), Canadian mycologist
