= Hymn of the Azores =

Regional anthem of the Portuguese autonomous region

Hino dos Açores
English: Hymn of the Azores
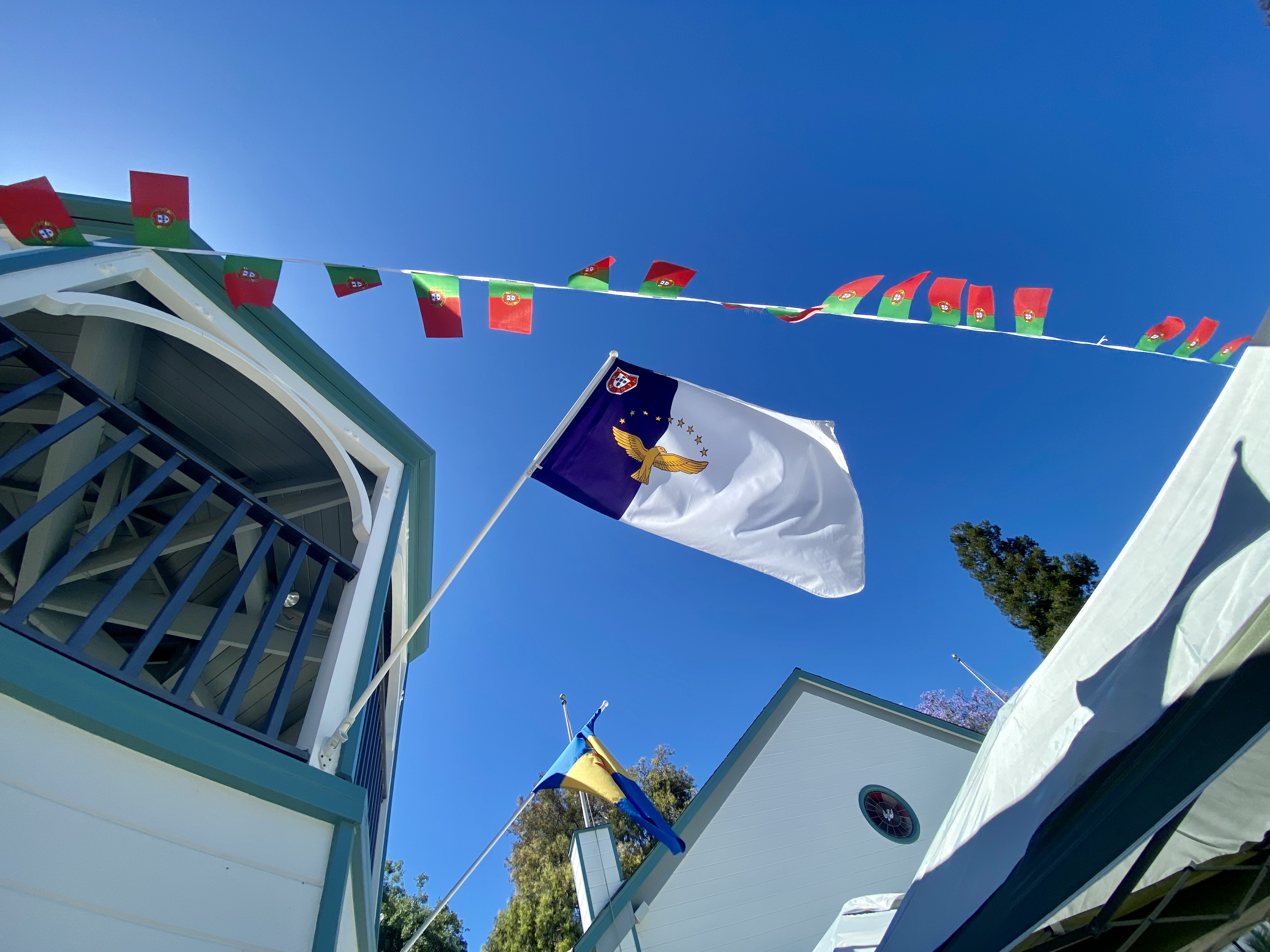
- Regional anthem of the Azores, Portugal
- Lyrics: Natália Correia, 19 May 1979
- Music: Joaquim Lima (1890) Original; Teófilo Frazão (1979) Adaption
- Adopted: 21 October 1980

The "Hymn of the Azores" (Portuguese: Hino dos Açores) is the official regional anthem used during some ceremonies in the Portuguese autonomous region of the Azores. For official purposes, the national anthem, "A Portuguesa", is always used during government events, in sporting venues, and during other civic ceremonies.

== History ==
The original song was composed by Joaquim Lima, a musician and director of the Philharmonic Band of Rabo de Peixe, the Filarmónica Progresso do Norte, in the 1890s, when a movement for autonomy was growing within the archipelago. It was first played by the band on 3 February 1894 and was originally titled "Hino Popular da Autonomia dos Açores" ("The Popular Hymn of Autonomy for the Azores").

On the same day, António Tavares Torres, President of the Executive of the municipality of Ribeira Grande, accompanied by a group of friends from the Filarmónica Progresso do Norte, went to Ponta Delgada to play the hymn in public. After playing for the members of the Autonomous Electoral Commission, as it became late, they gathered at the Campo de São Francisco with a large group of autonomy supporters and crossed the streets towards the Centro Autonomista, where they participated in a rally for the forthcoming general elections. During this rally, several speakers promoted the autonomic agenda, including: Caetano de Andrade, Pereira Ataíde, Gil Mont'Alverne de Sequeira and Duarte de Almeida.

On 14 April 1894, Gil Mont'Alverne de Sequeira, Pereira Ataíde and Duarte de Andrade Albuquerque were elected deputies under the Autonomist banner and celebrated their success with a march through the streets of Ponta Delgada accompanied by Philharmonic Bands playing the "Hino da Autonomia".

On 9 March 1895, the philharmonic bands also played the "Hino da Autonomia" in the municipal square of Ponta Delgada during the festival marking the promulgation of the 2 March 1895 Decree establishing limited autonomy for the Azores.

Originally, Lima's anthem had no lyrics, but as a function of political evolution, many unofficial regional lyrics were written to support local autonomy. The first recognized hymn became the anthem of Partido Progressista Autonomista ("Autonomous Progressive Party"), led by José Maria Raposo de Amaral, in São Miguel. Its lyrics were composed by the poet António Tavares Torres, a native of Rabo de Peixe and political militant of the Progressive Party.

=== Modern anthem ===
Official flag of the Azores, adopted in the same Decree that instituted the Hymn

Following the legal autonomy of the Azores, the Regional Government asked Azorean poet Natália de Oliveira Correia to compose official lyrics for the anthem. The government also adopted Teófilo Frazão's arrangement of the original melody as the official version of the anthem.

Approved by the Regional Assembly on 19 May 1979, it was promulgated and adopted on 21 October 1980 as a ceremonial anthem of the Regional Government.

The official version of the "Hymn of the Azores" was performed publicly on 27 June 1984 by students of the Colégio de São Francisco Xavier, during a ceremony that reunited the President of the Azores (João Bosco da Mota Amaral), members of the Regional Government, and various official attendees. It was sung by 600 children, wearing blue skirts/pants, white shirts and yellow handkerchiefs, and it was directed by professor Eduarda Cunha Ataíde.

The official anthem, "A Portuguesa", with which the "Hymn of the Azores" has no legal standing, is used in all governmental capacities, in sporting venues, and during other civic ceremonies.

== Lyrics ==
Portuguese original

I
Deram frutos a fé e a firmeza
no esplendor de um cântico novo:
os Açores são a nossa certeza
de traçar a glória de um povo.

Para a frente! Em comunhão,
pela nossa autonomia.
Liberdade, justiça e razão
estão acesas no alto clarão
da bandeira que nos guia.

Coro:
Para a frente! Lutar, batalhar
pelo passado imortal.
No futuro a luz semear,
de um povo triunfal.

II
De um destino com brio alcançado
colheremos mais frutos e flores;
porque é esse (Note: Occasionally written este ("this").) o sentido sagrado
das estrelas que coroam os Açores.

Para a frente, Açorianos! (Note: Occasionally written Açoriano ("Azorean").)
Pela paz à terra unida.
Largos voos, com ardor, firmamos,
para que mais floresçam os ramos
da vitória merecida.

Coro

IPA transcription (Note: See Help:IPA/Portuguese and Portuguese phonology.)

1
[ˈdɛ.ɾɐ̃w̃ ˈfɾu.tuz‿ɐ ˈfɛ‿i ɐ fiɾ.ˈme.zɐ]
[nu‿(ɨ)ʃ.pɫẽ.ˈdoɾ dɨ‿ũ ˈkɐ̃.ti.ku ˈno.vu]
[uz‿ɐ.ˈsoɾ.ɨʃ sɐ̃w̃ ɐ ˈnɔ.sɐ sɨɾ.ˈte.zɐ]
[dɨ tɾɐ.ˈsaɾ ɐ ˈɡɫɔ.ɾjɐ dɨ‿ũ ˈpo.vu]

[ˈpɐ.ɾɐ‿ɐ ˈfɾẽ.tɨ‿ɐ̃j̃ ku.mu.ˈɲɐ̃w̃]
[ˈpe.ɫɐ ˈnɔ.sɐ ˌaw.tu.nu.ˈmi.ɐ]
[ɫi.βɨɾ.ˈða.ðɨ ʒuʃ.ˈti.s(ɐ)‿i ʁɐ.ˈzɐ̃w̃]
[(i)ʃ.ˈtɐ̃w̃ ɐ.ˈse.zɐʒ‿nu ˈaɫ.tu kɫɐ.ˈɾɐ̃w̃]
[dɐ bɐ̃.ˈdɐj.ɾɐ kɨ nuʒ‿ˈɡi.ɐ]

[ˈko.ɾu]
[ˈpɐ.ɾɐ‿ɐ ˈfɾẽ.tɨ ɫu.ˈtaɾ bɐ.tɐ.ˈʎar]
[ˈpe.ɫu pɐ.ˈsa.du(‿)i.muɾ.ˈtaɫ]
[ˈnu fu.ˈtu.ɾu ɐ ˈɫuʃ sɨ.mi.ˈjaɾ]
[dɨ‿ũ ˈpo.vu tɾi.jũ.ˈfaɫ]

2
[dɨ‿ũ dɨʃ.ˈti.nu kõ ˈbɾi.u aɫ.kɐ̃.ˈsa.du]
[ku.ʎɨ.ˈɾe.muʒ‿ˈmajʃ ˈfɾu.tuz‿i ˈfɫo.ɾɨʃ]
[ˈpuɾ.k(ɨ)‿ɛ ˈe.s‿u sẽ.ˈti.ðu sɐ.ˈɣɾa.ðu]
[dɐz‿ɨʃ.ˈtɾe.ɫɐʃ kɨ k(u.)ˈɾo.ɐ̃w̃ uz‿ɐ.ˈsoɾ.ɨʃ]

[ˈpɐ.ɾɐ‿ɐ ˈfɾẽ.t‿ɐ.su.ɾi.ˈɐ.nuʃ]
[ˈpe.ɫɐ paz‿a ˈtɛ.ʁɐ u.ˈni.ðɐ]
[ˈɫaɾ.ɣuʒ‿ˈvo.uʃ kõ ɐɾ.ˈðoɾ fiɾ.ˈmɐ.muʃ]
[ˈpɐ.ɾɐ kɨ majʃ fɫu.ˈɾeʃ.sɐ̃w̃ uʒ‿ˈʁɐ.muʃ]
[dɐ vi.ˈtɔ.ɾjɐ mɨ.ɾɨ.ˈsi.ðɐ]

[ˈko.ɾu]

English translation

I
Bore fruits, faith and strength
in the splendour of a new chant:
the Azores are our certainty
for the glory of a people.

Forward! In communion,
for our autonomy.
Freedom, justice and reason
are kindled in the high light
of the flag that guides us.

Chorus:
Forward! To struggle, to battle
for our immortal past.
In the future to cast the light,
of a triumphant people.

II
Of a destiny with dignity achieved
we shall pluck more fruits and flowers;
because that is the sacred sense
of the stars that crown the Azores.

Forward, Azoreans!
For peace united with land.
High flights, with passion, we draw,
so that may flourish the branches
of deserved victory.

Chorus
