= New Portuguese Letters =

1973 book by Maria Isabel Barreno, Maria Teresa Horta, and Maria Velho da Costa

- Authors: Maria Isabel Barreno; Maria Teresa Horta; Maria Velho da Costa
- Original title: Novas Cartas Portuguesas
- Translator: Helen R Lane
- Language: Portuguese
- Subject: Feminism
- Published: 1972 (Portugal); 1975 (UK, US)
- Publisher: Estúdios Cor (Portugal); Victor Gollancz (UK); Doubleday (US)
- Publication place: Portugal
- Media type: Print

New Portuguese Letters (Portuguese: Novas Cartas Portuguesas) is a literary work composed of letters, essays, poems, fragments, puzzles and excerpts from legal documents, published jointly by the Portuguese writers Maria Isabel Barreno, Maria Teresa Horta and Maria Velho da Costa in 1972. The authors became known internationally as "The Three Marias", which became the title of the book in its first translation to English.

The book's publication and banning, its subsequent stage adaptations, and the international outcry over the arrest of the authors, revealed to the world the existence of extremely discriminatory dictatorial repression and the power of the Catholic patriarchy in Portugal. New Portuguese Letters also denounced the injustices of Portuguese colonialism and played a part in the downfall of the Second Republic and the authoritarian regimes which had ruled Portugal since 1926.

== Summary ==
New Portuguese Letters (NPL) was conceived in 1971, three years before the Carnation Revolution and the consequent independence of the Portuguese colonies in Africa. Its authors, Maria Isabel Barreno, Maria Teresa Horta and Maria Velho da Costa, were already established writers. They began to meet twice weekly in Lisbon, publicly for lunch and privately for dinner, in order to "examine the problems they shared as women and as liberal writers." A volume of poetry by Horta had recently been banned, and they intended their new work as a direct challenge to the censors, and also, one critic has written, as "an incitement to insurrection, based on the conviction that "when woman rebels against man, nothing remains unchanged" ([NPL p.] 158)."

The three authors exchanged writings, drawing inspiration from the seventeenth century classic Letters of a Portuguese Nun. That work comprises five letters allegedly written by a Portuguese nun named Sister Mariana Alcoforado who lived in the Convent of the Conception in Beja, Portugal, after she was seduced and abandoned by her lover, a French knight, who was fighting in the Portuguese Restoration War against Spain.

New Portuguese Letters combines letters, essays, poems, fragments, puzzles and excerpts from legal documents in unpredictable order. The three Marias write to and as the Marianas, Marias and Anas whom they have invented as the original Sister Mariana's female descendants, "vítimas da opressão patriarcal, da violência social, da injustiça e da discriminação" (victims of patriarchal oppression, social violence, injustice and discrimination). In some of the letters they write as men, husbands, lovers, fathers, etc.: "the letters they invent come from men fighting in colonial wars in Europe, Angola, or Africa, addressing the women they leave behind ... husbands absent for twelve years write letters home, blithely describing new mistresses, new families they have engendered, while their Portuguese wives remain faithful, dressed in widow's weeds."

They also write to and about each other: "Each Maria thus serves as analyst as well as reader-critic for the other two ... They purposely shift roles from analyst to analysand repeatedly ... their own image for the process is an open parabola ... suggest[ing] the dynamic relationship between three shifting entities, three bodies that want to remain open to experimentation, to suggestion, to analysis, to each other. ... Each Maria, moreover, is a critic as well as a reader of the theories of the other two. They disagree about the uses and value of the women's movement; about the causes, consequences, and remedies for patriarchy; about the solutions to women's misery in the modern world."

== Authorship ==
The three writers signed the work together and never revealed which one composed each fragment, as "a symbol of their sisterhood and the common sufferings of women". Some academic studies attempted to determine the authorship of the various texts that compose the book by comparison with their individually authored literary works. Others respected their decision and rationale: "They call their process of writing, their final product, and their relationship a trialectic in order to disrupt all dichotomies, all binary oppositions that .. are so often exploited to define and circumscribe woman, desire, discourse."

== Political reception ==
The book was immediately successful in Portugal after its publication in 1972, and acclaimed as a masterpiece, but was quickly banned by censors, described as "pornographic and an offense to public morals", and the three authors were arrested and imprisoned, charged with "abuse of the freedom of the press" and "outrage to public decency". The authors smuggled their book to France, sending it to the editors of three French feminists whose work they admired, and thus it reached the French women's liberation movement. The book and the arrests became internationally famous.

A campaign of protests against the detention of the three Marias was discussed at the first International Feminist Planning Conference, sponsored by the National Organization for Women, held in Cambridge, Massachusetts, in June 1973. Protests were held on the date the trial of the three Marias was scheduled to begin, July 3, 1973, in the US, France, Italy, England, Belgium, Finland and Japan, as well as in Portugal and Brazil. The proceedings were suspended several times, and further protests were held at the time of hearings in October 1973 and in January and February 1974. Following the coup of April 25, 1974 which ended the dictatorship of Marcelo Caetano, the trial was terminated and the authors pardoned, with the judge declaring the book "of outstanding literary merit".

Soon after their acquittal, Maria Velho da Costa publicly dissociated herself from feminism and women's liberation groups. She joined the Portuguese Communist Party. Both Maria Isabel Barreno and Maria Teresa Horta were members of the Portuguese women's liberation movement, although by mid 1975 Horta had resigned due to frustration with low numbers and lack of engagement with working-class women.

== Literary reception ==
As a literary work, New Portuguese Letters is not easily classifiable. If it is not a novel or essay, it is not just a feminist manifesto. As the scholar Darlene Sadlier points out, the three Marias themselves refer to their book as "something unclassifiable", which suggests not so much the difficulty as rather the reluctance of the authors to categorize the book, thus rejecting the logic of traditional literary forms. Critics have attempted to describe it, one saying it was "a huge and complicated garland—or perhaps wreath—of poetry and prose", another seeing roots in Portuguese literary tradition, particularly the work of Bernardim Ribeiro: "Like [Ribeiro's] Menina e moça, the New Letters also contain a series of concentric "sentimental" stories of love and sorrow." A 2006 Portuguese study describes it as "um palimpsesto, na medida em que a sua superfície esconde níveis de significação mais profundos" (a palimpsest, in which its surface hides deeper levels of signification); others have called it "a post-modern collage of fiction, personal letters, poetry, and erotica".

While the trial of the three Marias was widely reported in English-language media, the first English translation, by Helen R Lane, was not published until 1975. Evaluations of its literary merits were mixed. Some reviewers found that it "labours under cliché", and was "experimental in the worst sense, a rearrangement of clichés which lead nowhere." Another reviewer wrote, "Hectic, confined, plangent, these letters convey an intolerable tension ... The real meat of the book is in the documentation, in the glimpses of Lisbon rooms, Lisbon streets, in the reported lives of housemaids, schoolgirls, soldiers, grannies, in the flat and appalling statements quoted from the Portuguese Penal Code. In these areas the writing triumphs, conveying the flavour of a way of life we need to understand."

Reviewers were also divided in their estimation of the descriptions of love and sex. One reviewer said, "It is a tour-de-force of erotic expression and lyric outpourings"; another wrote, introducing two pieces republished from the book, that she found them "startling ... The selections demonstrate the arc throughout the volume, that of eroticism insisting upon its role in politics. The graphic description of a nun masturbating recalls Mariana's isolation, fervor, and fury at her trap". The New York Times reviewer found the book "tedious", saying "part of the trouble is that these three modern Marias are as obsessed with love as poor Soror Mariana. ... Whether they are taking the voice of Mariana of the convent, or any of the other Marianas, Marias and Maria Anas they have invented, or their own voices, they always manage to evoke the sense of some terrible wasting disease afflicting and at the same time thrilling them.

Exiled Portuguese writer Hélder Macedo, reviewing the book in the Times Literary Supplement, commented on the fact that it has three authors: "each of the three writes to each of the others and [] all three together write collectively to others. One of the main interests of the book, as literature, resides precisely in this ever-shifting identity of the subject, ... constantly changing while the predicate remains essentially unchanged."

== Impact on feminism ==
The book has been considered a crucial landmark in the evolution of feminist thinking in Portuguese literature. Women began to talk about their bodies, about the pleasures and sufferings of their sexual relationship with men, and they shocked Portuguese society on account of that. Through all its elements, the book conveys a single message: women also have a voice and know how to speak.

A Portuguese feminist scholar, Ana Margarida Dias Martins, contends that "one of the grim consequences of this book’s astounding international success was that, although it remained important in the political context of international feminist solidarity, it failed to enter the feminist canon of theory texts in Europe and the US." She points out that "[d]uring the wave of international solidarity, only fragments of the book circulated in translation", and quotes radical feminist Robin Morgan as writing, “When the book was published in the United States, the English translation seemed to me somewhat less inspiring than the selections .. done by Gilda Grillo and Louise Bernikow [for a live performance in 1974]."

Some reviewers of the first English translation did consider its contribution to feminist theory. Jane Kramer wrote, "As a feminist book, though, “The Three Marias” is in trouble ... while it is true that the exercise of passion was their agreed‐on exercise, their collective lamentations on passion never really penetrate love's tyrannies or its embittering social and familiar uses as much as they detail some morbid and inescapable pathology. In their portraits of imagined sisters through the centuries, the convent of Soror Mariana becomes a metaphor for the bedroom, and the bedroom for the world to which women are confined—which is appropriate, since their women rarely seem to leave their bedrooms except to go mad or kill themselves. But the impression one gets from this is that the women of Portugal are all in a state of torpid but advanced sexual hysteria, or a state of sexual repression".

Juliet Mitchell, author of Psychoanalysis and Feminism, wrote: "Feminism, the relationship of literature to society and the importance of revolution weave their way through the intellectual discussions within the book ... The nun is an image of the Portuguese woman who is not only the victim of an oppressive, authoritarian and male-dominated society but one who even in the act of breaking free (a nun with a lover) cannot transcend her general female identity as eternal victim. Even in the exuberance of her passion the 17th century nun, as the three Marias conceive her, is near to whining and total self-centredness. .... A lot of ideas, a lot of issues, are raised by the book. But ultimately I find it irritating ... The different strands counteract rather than complete each other, so that just as one is wanting to agree or disagree with some point of analysis (I personally disagree quite a lot) one is called to a halt by a bit of poetry. And the poetry is not good enough to stand on its own merits."

Linda S. Kauffman, a feminist literary theory scholar, challenges these perceptions, saying "The writing is a process of searching for the law of their own desires. They inscribe those desires in part by speaking to the nun rather than about her and by transforming her from victim into victor, famous in all the courts of Europe for her celebrated letters .... the nun, after all, does not destroy herself; instead, she writes."

== Adaptations ==
New Portuguese Letters (or excerpts from it) had public readings on stage and radio, during the trial of its authors and after it was published in translation, in several countries including the US, UK and France. Several plays were based on it, including:

- Parto ("Childbirth"), by Brazilian playwright Gilda Grillo and Maria Isabel Barreno (performed in New York and Paris in 1974 and 1975)
- The Three Marias, by American poet Faith Gillespie, performed in London, England, and shown on Granada TV in 1975
- New Sonnets from the Portuguese, a dance-drama by Australian choreographer Margaret Barr, performed in Sydney, Australia, in 1975
- Maria, Anon by Susan Galbraith (performed in Minneapolis in 1981)
- The Three Marias by Rui Braga and Georgian student Tamar Aznarashvili, performed in a psychiatric hospital, Centro Hospitalar Conde Ferreira, in Porto, Portugal, in 2016, and in Miragaia, Porto, in 2017.
