= Maria Velho da Costa =

Portuguese writer (1938–2020)

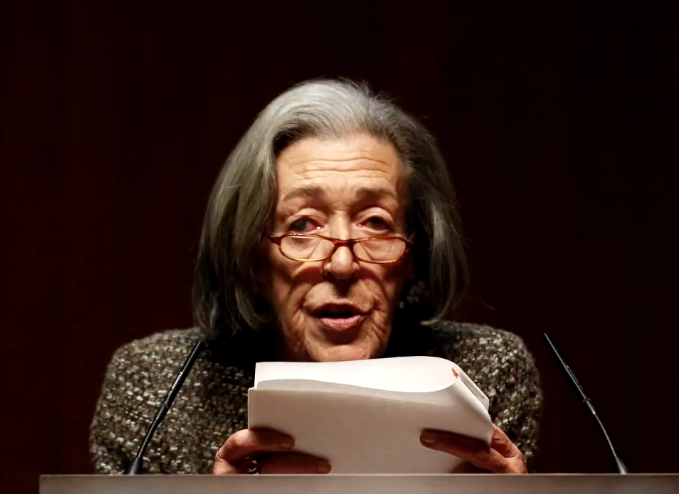
- Born: 26 June 1938
- Died: 23 May 2020 (aged 81)
- Education: University of Lisbon
- Awards: Camões Prize

Maria de Fátima de Bivar Velho da Costa (26 June 1938 – 23 May 2020) was a Portuguese writer who was awarded the Camões Prize in 2002. She took part in the Portuguese Feminist Movement, and became one of the authors of the book Novas Cartas Portugesas (New Portuguese Letters), together with Maria Teresa Horta and Maria Isabel Barreno. The authors, known as the "Three Marias," were arrested, jailed and prosecuted under Portuguese censorship laws in 1972, during the last years of the Estado Novo dictatorship. The book and their trial inspired protests in Portugal and attracted international attention from European and American women's liberation groups in the years leading up to the Carnation Revolution.

== Biography ==
Maria Velho da Costa was born on 26 June 1938 in Lisbon. She was born out of wedlock but later legitimated by the marriage of her parents, Afonso Jaime de Bivar Moreira de Brito Velho da Costa and his second wife, Julieta Vaz Monteiro da Assunção. Her father, an infantry officer promoted to the rank of colonel, became a member of the press censorship corps on the censorship commission in Lisbon in 1958.

She graduated with a degree in Germanic Philology from the Faculty of Letters in the University of Lisbon. She has worked as a secondary school teacher and served as president of the Associação Portuguesa de Escritores (Portuguese Association of Writers). She was a Reader in the Portuguese and Brazilian Studies at King's College London from 1980 to 1987.

After the Carnation Revolution she served as a cultural ambassador for the Government of Portugal; she was Adjunct to the Secretary of State for Culture in 1979 and a Cultural Attaché in Cape Verde from 1988 to 1990. She also carried out duties for the Comissão Nacional para as Comemorações dos Descobrimentos Portugueses (National Commission for the Commemoration of the Portuguese Age of Discovery) and worked in the Instituto Camões, the international institution for Portuguese language and culture supported by the Government of Portugal.

From 1975 onward, she regularly collaborated on film scripts, specifically in films by João César Monteiro, Margarida Gil e Alberto Seixas Santos.

Already an established writer by 1969, with the novel Maina Mendes, she became better known after the controversy over Novas Cartas Portuguesas (New Portuguese Letters), a work that protested in open opposition to traditionally feminine values. This publication, clearly antifascist and above all provocative against the Estado Novo regime, brought her and her co-authors, called the "Three Marias" (Maria Velho da Costa, Maria Teresa Horta, and Maria Isabel Barreno) before a tribunal, until the Carnation Revolution, on 25 April 1974, ended their trial and interrupted the sanctions to which they had been subjected.

She expanded the theses of the vindication of women's rights, already proclaimed in Novas Cartas Portuguesas, in her later work, a non-confirmism concerning narrative canons, which could also be seen in her essays.

She married Adérito de Oliveira Sedas Nunes (1928–1992), the "founding father" of Portuguese Sociology and a government minister, son of Élio Sedas Nunes and wife Maria de Oliveira, at the Church of São Tiago, in São Tiago, Lisbon, in 1962. They had one son, João Afonso de Bivar Sedas Nunes (born 1963), like his father a sociologist and a university professor.

She died on 23 May 2020 in Lisbon, at the age of 81.

== Prizes and recognition ==
She received the following awards:

- Prémio Vergílio Ferreira (Vergílio Ferreira Prize), from the University of Évora, in 1997, for her collected works
- Prémio Camões (Camões Prize), in 2002
- Prémio Correntes de Escritas, in 2008, for her novel, Myra
- Grande Prémio de Literatura dst (dstgroup Grand Prize in Literature), in 2010, for Myra

She received the following honors from the Government of Portugal:

- Grand Officer (Grande-Oficial) of the Order of Prince Henry (9 June 2003)
- Grand Officer (Grande-Oficial) of the Order of Liberty (25 April 2011)

In 2020, the Sociedade Portuguesa de Autores (Portuguese Society of Authors) instituted the Prémio de Literatura Maria Velho Costa (Maria Velho Costa Prize in Literature) in her honor, and awarded the first prize in the same year to the author Teresa Noronha, for her book Tornado.

== Bibliography ==
- O Lugar Comum. 1966
- Maina Mendes. 1969
- Ensino Primário e Ideologia. 1972
- Novas Cartas Portuguesas. (with Maria Teresa Horta and Maria Isabel Barreno) 1972
- Desescrita. 1973
- Cravo. 1976
- Português; Trabalhador; Doente Mental. 1977
- Casas Pardas. 1977
- Da Rosa Fixa. 1978
- Corpo Verde. 1979
- Lucialima. 1983
- O Mapa Cor de Rosa. 1984
- Missa in Albis. 1988
- Das Áfricas. (with José Afonso Furtado) 1991
- Dores. (short stories, with Teresa Dias Coelho) 1994
- Irene ou o Contrato Social. 2000
- O Livro do Meio. (an epistolary novel, with Armando Silva Carvalho) 2006
- Myra. 2008
- O Amante do Crato. (short stories) 2012

== See also ==
- List of Portuguese writers
- Maria Teresa Horta
