= Maria Isabel Barreno =

Portuguese writer

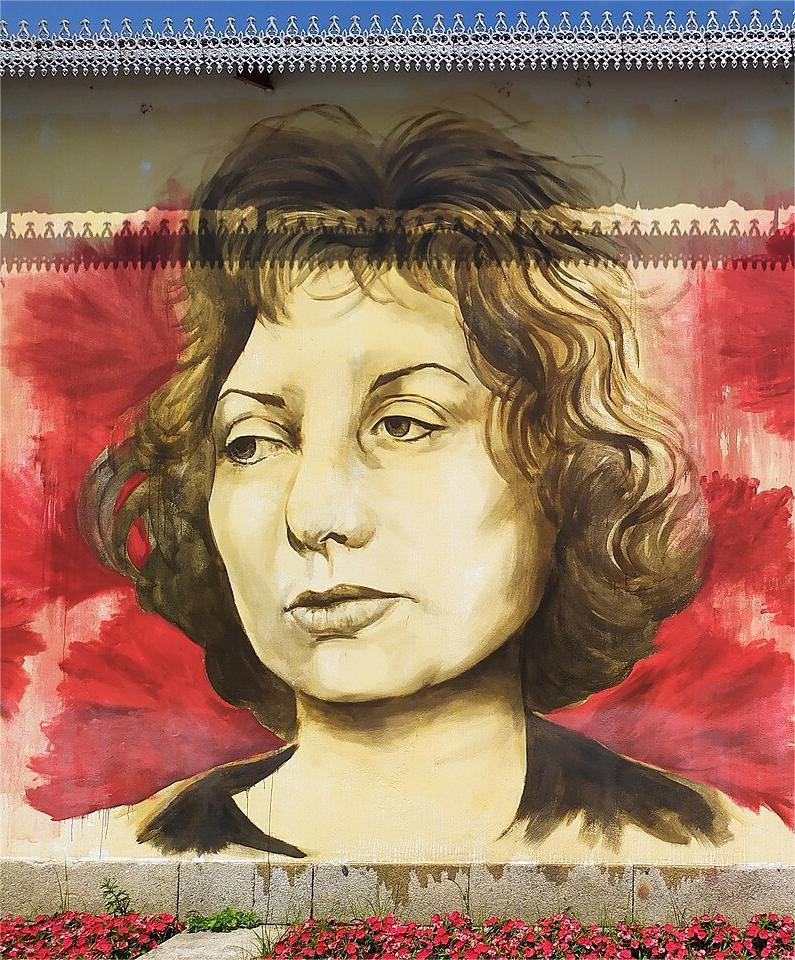
- Born: Maria Isabel Barreno; 10 July 1939; Lisbon, Portugal
- Died: 3 September 2016 (aged 77)
- Education: University of Lisbon
- Occupation: Writer
- Writing career
- Language: Portuguese

Maria Isabel Barreno de Faria Martins GOIH (10 July 1939 – 3 September 2016) was a Portuguese writer, essayist, journalist and sculptor. She was one of the authors of the book Novas Cartas Portugesas (New Portuguese Letters), together with Maria Teresa Horta and Maria Velho da Costa. The authors, known as the "Three Marias," were arrested, jailed and prosecuted under Portuguese censorship laws in 1972, during the last years of the Estado Novo dictatorship. The book and their trial inspired protests in Portugal and attracted international attention from European and American women's liberation groups in the years leading up to the Carnation Revolution.

== Biography ==
Born in Lisbon in the freguesia of Socorro, her parents moved to Areeiro, where she spent her childhood and adolescence. She studied College of Letters at the Universidade de Lisboa, where she graduated in Historico-Philosophical Sciences.

After graduation she took a job working for the Instituto de Investigação Industrial. She dedicated herself to the cause of feminism, taking part in the Portuguese feminist movement together with the writers Maria Teresa Horta and Maria Velho da Costa, the "Three Marias" (Três Marias).

On 8 March 2004 she was made a Grand Official in the Ordem do Infante D. Henrique.

Barreno died on 3 September 2016 at the age of 77. A 1975 photo of the Three Marias published in The Economist shows Isabel Barreno on the right. A late-life photo of her appears with her obituary on a Portuguese government site, cig.gov.pt.

== Works ==
- Adaptação do Trabalhador de Origem Rural ao Meio Industrial Urbano (1966)
- A Condição da Mulher Portuguesa (1968) (collaboration)
- De Noite as Árvores São Negras (1968)
- Os Outros Legítimos Superiores (1970)
- Novas Cartas Portuguesas (1972) (co-authored with Maria Teresa Horta and Maria Velho da Costa)
- A Morte da Mãe (1979)
- A Imagem da Mulher na Imprensa (1976)
- Inventário de Ana (1982)
- Contos Analógicos (1983)
- Sinos do Universo (1984)
- Contos (1985)
- Célia e Celina (1985)
- O Outro Desbotado (1986)
- O Falso Neutro (1989)
- O Direito ao Presente (1990)
- Crónica do Tempo (1991) – winner of the Fernando Namora Prize
- O enviado (1991)
- O Chão Salgado (1992)
- Os Sensos Incomuns (1993) – winner of the Prémio P.E.N. Clube Português de Ficção, and the Grande Prémio de Conto Camilo Castelo Branco
- O Senhor das Ilhas (1994)
- As Vésperas Esquecidas (1999)
