= Maria Teresa Horta =

Portuguese journalist and activist (1937–2025)

- Born: Maria Teresa Mascarenhas Horta; 20 May 1937; Lisbon, Portugal
- Died: 4 February 2025 (aged 87); Lisbon, Portugal
- Education: University of Lisbon
- Spouse: Luís de Barros (d. 2019)

Maria Teresa de Mascarenhas Horta Barros (20 May 1937 – 4 February 2025) was a Portuguese feminist poet, journalist and activist. She is one of the authors of the book Novas Cartas Portuguesas (New Portuguese Letters), together with Maria Isabel Barreno and Maria Velho da Costa. The authors, known as the "Three Marias," were arrested, jailed and prosecuted under Portuguese censorship laws in 1972, during the last years of the Estado Novo dictatorship. The book and their trial inspired protests in Portugal and attracted international attention from European and American women's liberation groups in the years leading up to the Carnation Revolution.

== Early life and career ==
Horta had a bachelor's degree from the Universidade de Lisboa and worked as a journalist. She took part in the Portuguese Feminist Movement with Maria Isabel Barreno and Maria Velho da Costa (the Three Marias) and was a member of the Poesia 61 group.

Her writing has been published in such journals as Diário de Lisboa, A Capital, República, O Século, Diário de Notícias and Jornal de Letras e Artes, and she was editor in chief of Mulheres magazine.

The Three Marias (she and Maria Isabel Barreno and Maria Velho da Costa) are among the 50 Portuguese authors selected by António M. Feijó, João R. Figueiredo and Miguel Tamen, professors and essayists from the Faculty of Letters of the University of Lisbon, to appear in the book O Cânone published by Tinta da China in 2020.

The Portuguese Ministry of Culture awarded her the Medal of Cultural Merit in 2020.

In 2021 she was awarded the Casino da Póvoa Literary Prize 2021, at the Correntes d'Escritas literature festival, for her work Estranhezas. In the same year, she was honored at the International Literary Festival of the Interior, created in honor of the victims of the 2017 fires.

On 21 April 2022, she was awarded the degree of Grand Officer of the Order of Liberty.

== Personal life and death ==
Horta was the daughter of Jorge Augusto da Silva Horta, Bastonary of the Ordem dos Médicos (General Medical Council of Portugal) and a university professor, and his wife D. Carlota Maria Mascarenhas, of the Marquesses of Fronteira, Counts of Torre and Counts of Coculim, and also Marquesses of Alorna (formerly Marquesses of Castelo Novo) and Counts of Assumar.

She was married to Luís Barros, until his death in 20 November 2019. Her son, Luís Jorge Horta Barros, born on 4 April 1965, is married to Maria Antónia Martins Peças Pereira and has two sons, Bé and Tiago Horta Barros.

Horta died in Lisbon on 4 February 2025, at the age of 87.

== Awards ==
In December 2024, Maria Teresa Horta was included on the BBC's 100 Women list.

== Works ==
- Espelho Inicial (1960) (poetry)
- Tatuagem (1961)
- Cidadelas Submersas (1961)
- Verão Coincidente (1962)
- Amor Habitado (1963)
- Candelabro (1964)
- Jardim de Inverno (1966)
- Cronista Não é Recado (1967)
- Minha Senhora de Mim (1967) (poetry)
- Ambas as Mãos sobre o Corpo (1970)
- Novas Cartas Portuguesas (1971)
- Ana (1974)
- Poesia Completa I e II (1983)
- Os Anjos (1983)
- O Transfer (1984)
- Ema (1984)
- Minha Mãe, Meu Amor (1984)
- Rosa Sangrenta (1987)
- Antologia Política (1994)
- A Paixão Segundo Constança H. (1994)
- O Destino (1997)
- A Mãe na Literatura Portuguesa (1999)
- As Luzes de Leonor (2011)
- As Palavras do Corpo – Antologia de Poesia Erótica (2012)
- A Dama e o Unicórnio (2013)
- Anunciações (2016)

=== In translation ===
- "Seven Poems from Poesia Reunida (Collected Poetry)". Trans. Dean Thomas Ellis, The Puritan # 25 (Spring 2014 Supplement).
- Point of Honour: Selected Poems of Maria Teresa Horta. Trans. Lesley Saunders. (Two Rivers Press Ltd, 2019) ISBN 978-1-909747-47-0
